= Dublin Cabra =

Dáil constituency (1977–1981)

- Former Dáil constituency

Former constituency
- Created: 1977
- Abolished: 1981
- Seats: 3
- Local government area: Dublin City
- Created from: Dublin Central; Dublin North-West
- Replaced by: Dublin Central; Dublin West

Dublin Cabra was a parliamentary constituency represented in Dáil Éireann, the lower house of the Irish parliament or Oireachtas from 1977 to 1981. The constituency elected 3 deputies (Teachtaí Dála, commonly known as TDs) to the Dáil, using proportional representation by means of the single transferable vote (PR-STV).

== History ==
The constituency was created in 1977, under the Electoral (Amendment) Act 1974, taking in parts of the former Dublin North-West and Dublin Central constituencies, as part of the redistribution of constituencies which attempted to secure the re-election of the outgoing Fine Gael–Labour Party government. The constituency was abolished in 1981 with most of it going into a revived Dublin Central constituency. There were 16 electoral areas in Dublin Cabra; 13 went to Dublin Central for the 1981 election, with three going to the new Dublin West (the areas of Phoenix Park, Cabra West A and Cabra West C).

== Boundaries ==
It covered the Cabra, Arran Quay and Phoenix Park areas of Dublin city.

== TDs ==
Teachtaí Dála (TDs) for Dublin Cabra 1977–1981
Key to parties: FF = Fianna Fáil; FG = Fine Gael
Dáil	Election	Deputy (Party)	Deputy (Party)	Deputy (Party)
21st	1977	Tom Leonard (FF)	Vivion de Valera (FF)	Hugh Byrne (FG)
22nd	1981	Constituency abolished		

Note: The columns in this table are used only for presentational purposes, and no significance should be attached to the order of columns. For details of the order in which seats were won at each election, see the detailed results of that election.

== 1977 general election ==
*: Outgoing TD

1977 general election: Dublin Cabra
Party	Candidate	FPv%	Count								
Party	Candidate	FPv%	1	2	3	4	5	6	7	8	9
Fianna Fáil	Vivion de Valera	22.9	5,830	5,836	5,852	6,017	6,071	7,278			
Fine Gael	Hugh Byrne	19.9	5,042	5,050	5,776	5,953	6,206	6,287	6,307	6,748	
Fianna Fáil	Tom Leonard	14.7	3,728	3,741	3,756	4,019	4,055	4,929	5,740	5,956	5,988
Labour	Patrick Carroll	11.1	2,817	2,831	2,875	3,097	3,702	3,796	3,821	5,625	5,850
Fianna Fáil	Richard Gogan	8.8	2,224	2,235	2,252	2,375	2,436				
Labour	David Thornley	6.4	1,615	1,628	1,671	1,860					
Labour	Michael Mullen	6.3	1,603	1,612	1,693	1,965	2,766	2,846	2,858		
Independent	Frank Sherwin	5.6	1,427	1,469	1,511						
Fine Gael	John McKay	3.9	991	997							
Independent	Frank Hall	0.5	126								
Electorate: 37,656 Valid: 25,403 Quota: 6,351 Turnout: 67.4%

== See also ==
- Dáil constituencies
- Politics of the Republic of Ireland
- Historic Dáil constituencies
- Elections in the Republic of Ireland
