= Dublin North-West =

Dáil constituency (1921–1923, 1937–1977, 1981–present)

- Dáil constituency
- Location of Dublin North-West within County Dublin
- Interactive map of constituency boundaries since the 2024 general election
- Major settlements: Ballymun; Beaumont; Finglas; Santry; Whitehall

Current constituency
- Created: 1981
- Seats: 4 (1981–2002); 3 (2002–)
- TDs: Dessie Ellis (SF); Rory Hearne (SD); Paul McAuliffe (FF)
- Local government areas: Dublin City
- Created from: Dublin Finglas
- EP constituency: Dublin

Dublin North-West
- Former Dáil constituency

Former constituency
- Created: 1937
- Abolished: 1977
- Seats: 5 (1937–1948); 3 (1948–1969); 4 (1969–1977)
- Local government area: Dublin City
- Created from: Dublin North
- Replaced by: Dublin Finglas; Dublin Cabra

Dublin North-West
- Former Dáil constituency

Former constituency
- Created: 1921
- Abolished: 1923
- Seats: 4
- Local government area: Dublin City
- Created from: Dublin Clontarf; Dublin St James's; Dublin St Michan's
- Replaced by: Dublin North

Dublin North-West is a parliamentary constituency in Dublin City represented in Dáil Éireann, the lower house of the Irish parliament or Oireachtas. The constituency elects three deputies (Teachtaí Dála, commonly known as TDs) on the system of proportional representation by means of the single transferable vote (PR-STV).

== History and boundaries ==
The first constituency of this name was created by the Government of Ireland Act 1920 as a 4-seat constituency for the Southern Ireland House of Commons and a 1-seat constituency for the United Kingdom House of Commons at Westminster, combining the former Westminster constituencies of Dublin Clontarf, Dublin St James's and Dublin St Michan's. At the 1921 election for the Southern Ireland House of Commons, the seats were won uncontested by Sinn Féin, who treated it as part of the election to the Second Dáil. It was never used as a Westminster constituency; under s. 1(4) of the Irish Free State (Agreement) Act 1922, no writ was to be issued "for a constituency in Ireland other than a constituency in Northern Ireland". Therefore, no vote was held in Dublin North-West at the 1922 United Kingdom general election on 15 November 1922, shortly before the Irish Free State left the United Kingdom on 6 December 1922.

Under the Electoral Act 1923, which took effect at the 1923 general election, the area was divided between the constituencies of Dublin North and Dublin South.

A second constituency with this name was created by the Electoral (Revision of Constituencies) Act 1935, dividing the old Dublin North constituency into Dublin North-West and Dublin North-East, and first used at the 1937 general election. It was abolished in 1977, under the Electoral (Amendment) Act 1974, with most of the constituency going to the new constituency of Dublin Finglas with a smaller but significant portion going to a new Dublin Cabra constituency.

A third constituency with this name was created in the north-western area of the city by the Electoral (Amendment) Act 1980 and first used at the 1981 general election.

The constituency is overwhelmingly urban; it encompasses Ballymun, Finglas and parts of Glasnevin (Ballygall) and the area of Whitehall to the west of Swords Road in the local government area of Dublin City.

The Electoral (Amendment) Act 2023 defines the constituency as:

"In the city of Dublin, the electoral divisions of:

Ballygall A, Ballygall B, Ballygall C, Ballygall D, Ballymun A, Ballymun B, Ballymun C, Ballymun D, Ballymun E, Ballymun F, Beaumont A, Beaumont B, Beaumont F, Finglas North A, Finglas North B, Finglas North C, Finglas South A, Finglas South B, Finglas South C, Finglas South D, Kilmore A, Whitehall A, Whitehall B, Whitehall C, Whitehall D."

Changes to the Dublin North-West constituency 1921–1923, 1937–1977, 1981–present
Years	TDs	Boundaries	Notes
1921–1923	4	The wards of Clontarf East, Clontarf West and Drumcondra as well as that part of Mountjoy not in the constituency of Dublin Mid; New Kilmainham and Usher's Quay; and Arran Quay and Glasnevin	Created from Dublin Clontarf, Dublin St James's and Dublin St Michan's
1923–1937	—	Constituency abolished	Clontarf East, Clontarf West, Drumcondra, Mountjoy, Arran Quay and Glasnevin part of Dublin North; New Kilmainham and Usher's Quay part of Dublin South.
1937–1948	5	In the county borough of Dublin, the Arran Quay, Glasnevin, Inns Quay, North City and Rotunda Wards. The Mountjoy Ward except the portion thereof which is comprised in the Borough constituency of Dublin North-East. The townlands of:— Botanic Garden, Cabragh (Castleknock), Cabragh (Finglas), Castleknock (Phoenix Park), Chapelizod, Grangegorman North, Prospect, Slutsend or West Farm, St. James, Tolka Park, Violet Hill Great and Violet Hill Little, in so far as the same are situate within the County Borough of Dublin.	Created from abolished constituency of Dublin City North; and transfer of townlands from Dublin County in line with transfer of territory from the county to the city in 1931.
1948–1961	3	In the county borough of Dublin, the Arran Quay, Cabragh West and Phoenix Park Wards and the portion of the Cabragh East Ward which is not included in the borough constituency of Dublin North-Central.	Transfer of Glasnevin, Inns Quay, North City, Rotunda and portion of Mountjoy wards to Dublin North-Central.
1961–1969	3	In the county borough of Dublin, the Cabragh East, Cabragh West, Finglas East, Finglas West and Phoenix Park wards and that part of Glasnevin ward which is not included in the borough constituency of Dublin North-East.	Transfer of Arran Quay wards to Dublin North-Central; transfer of part of Glasnevin and the remainder of Cabragh East from Dublin North-Central
1969–1977	4	In the county borough of Dublin, the Cabragh West, Finglas West and Phoenix Park wards; that part of Finglas East ward which is not included in the constituency of Dublin North-Central; that part of Cabragh East ward which is not included in the constituency of Dublin North-Central; and that part of Arran Quay ward lying west of a line drawn as follows: commencing at the junction of Oxmantown Road with the ward boundary, thence in a south-easterly direction along Oxmantown Road to its junction with Moira Road, thence in a south-westerly direction along Moira Road to its junction with the northern boundary of St. Bricin's Hospital, thence commencing in an easterly direction and proceeding along the last-mentioned boundary, along the eastern boundary of Arbour Hill Barracks and along its imaginary southerly projection to its intersection by Arbour Hill, thence in a westerly direction along Arbour Hill to its junction with Temple Street West, thence in a southerly direction along Temple Street West and its imaginary southerly projection to its intersection by the ward boundary.	Transfer of part of Cabragh East, Finglas East and Glasnevin to Dublin North-Central; transfer of part of Arran Quay from Dublin North-Central
1977–1981	—	Constituency abolished	Transfer of Cabra West and the parts of Arran Quay and Cabra East to Dublin Cabra; transfer of Finglas West to Dublin Finglas.
1981–1992	5	In the county borough of Dublin, the wards of Drumcondra North C, Finglas East A, Finglas East B, Finglas East C, Finglas East D, Finglas East E, Finglas East F, Finglas West A, Finglas West B, Finglas West C, Santry A, Santry B; and in County Dublin, the district electoral divisions of Drumcondra Rural Number One (except the part thereof which is comprised in the constituency of Dublin North) and Drumcondra Rural Number Two (except the parts thereof which are comprised in the constituencies of Dublin North and Dublin North-Central); and the townlands of Charlestown, Jamestown Great, Jamestown Little, Meakstown, Poppintree, in the district electoral division of Finglas, and that part of the townland of Kildonan in the district electoral division of Finglas, situated east of an imaginary line joining— (a) the point of intersection of the boundary of the county borough of Dublin by the western boundary of No. 114 Northway Estate, and (b) the point of intersection, adjacent to Plunkett Crescent, of the said county borough boundary by the western edge of Cappagh Avenue.	Drumcondra North C and Santry B from Dublin Artane; Finglas East A, Finglas East B, Finglas East D, Finglas East E, Finglas East F, Finglas West A, Finglas West B and Finglas West C from Dublin Finglas; Drumcondra Rural, Finglas East C and Santry A from Dublin County North.
1992–1997	4	In the county borough of Dublin, the wards of Ballygall A, Ballygall B, Ballygall C, Ballygall D, Ballymun A, Ballymun B, Ballymun C, Ballymun D, Ballymun E, Ballymun F, Botanic A, Botanic B, Drumcondra South C, Finglas North A, Finglas North B, Finglas North C, Finglas South A, Finglas South B, Finglas South C, Finglas South D, Whitehall A, Whitehall B, Whitehall C; and those parts of the wards of Cabra East A, and Cabra West A situated north of a line drawn along the Royal Canal.	Transfer of the area bounded on the south by the Royal Canal, lona Road and St Alphonsus Road and on the east by Drumcondra Road from Dublin Central; minor adjustments with Dublin North and Dublin North-Central.
1997–2002	4	In the city of Dublin, the electoral divisions of Ballygall A, Ballygall B, Ballygall C, Ballygall D, Ballymun A, Ballymun B, Ballymun C, Ballymun D, Ballymun E, Ballymun F, Botanic A, Botanic B, Botanic C, Cabra East A, Drumcondra South C, Finglas North A, Finglas North B, Finglas North C, Finglas South A, Finglas South B, Finglas South C, Finglas South D, Whitehall A, Whitehall B, Whitehall C; and that part of the ward of Cabra West A situated north of a line drawn along the Royal Canal; and that part of the ward of Inns Quay A situated north of a line drawn along the North Circular Road.	Transfer of part of the Phibsboro/ Drumcondra area from Dublin Central.
2002–2007	3	In the city of Dublin, the electoral divisions of Ballygall A, Ballygall B, Ballygall C, Ballygall D, Ballymun A, Ballymun B, Ballymun C, Ballymun D, Ballymun E, Ballymun F, Finglas North A, Finglas North B, Finglas North C, Finglas South A, Finglas South B, Finglas South C, Finglas South D, Whitehall A, Whitehall B, Whitehall C; and in Fingal, the electoral divisions of Airport, Dubber, The Ward and Turnapin situated south of a line drawn as follows— commencing at the intersection of the south western boundary of the electoral division of The Ward by the M50 Northern Cross, thence commencing in a north-easterly direction and proceeding along the said M50 to its intersection by the eastern boundary of the electoral division of Turnapin, passing in a clockwise direction around and including roundabout No. 3 at the junction of the M50 Northern Cross with the M1 Motorway.	Transfer of parts of Cabra and Drumcondra to Dublin Central; extension north to the M50.
2007–2016	3	In the city of Dublin, the electoral divisions of Ballygall A, Ballygall B, Ballygall C, Ballygall D, Ballymun A, Ballymun B, Ballymun C, Ballymun D, Ballymun E, Ballymun F, Beaumont A, Finglas North A, Finglas North B, Finglas North C, Finglas South A, Finglas South B, Finglas South C, Finglas South D, Whitehall A, Whitehall B, Whitehall C, Whitehall D; and in Fingal, those parts of the electoral divisions of Airport, Blanchardstown-Abbotstown, Dubber, The Ward and Turnapin situated south of a line drawn along the Northern Cross Route (M50), passing in a clockwise direction around and including roundabout No. 3 at the junction of the Northern Cross Route (M50) with the M1 Motorway.	Transfer of Beaumont A and Whitehall D from Dublin North-Central; transfer of Blanchardstown-Abbotstown (part east of M50) from Dublin West.
2016–2020	3	In the city of Dublin, the electoral divisions of Ballygall A, Ballygall B, Ballygall C, Ballygall D, Ballymun A, Ballymun B, Ballymun C, Ballymun D, Ballymun E, Ballymun F, Beaumont A, Botanic A, Botanic B, Botanic C, Drumcondra South C, Finglas North A, Finglas North B, Finglas North C, Finglas South A, Finglas South B, Finglas South C, Finglas South D, Whitehall A, Whitehall B, Whitehall C, Whitehall D; and in Fingal, those parts of the electoral divisions of Airport, Blanchardstown-Abbotstown, Dubber, The Ward and Turnapin situated south of a line drawn along the Northern Cross Route (M50), passing in a clockwise direction around and including roundabout No. 3 at the junction of the Northern Cross Route (M50) with the M1 Motorway.	Transfer of Botanic A, B and C and Drumcondra South C from Dublin Central.
2020–2024	3	In the city of Dublin, the electoral divisions of Ballygall A, Ballygall B, Ballygall C, Ballygall D, Ballymun A, Ballymun B, Ballymun C, Ballymun D, Ballymun E, Ballymun F, Beaumont A, Finglas North A, Finglas North B, Finglas North C, Finglas South A, Finglas South B, Finglas South C, Finglas South D, Whitehall A, Whitehall B, Whitehall C, Whitehall D; and in Fingal, those parts of the electoral divisions of Airport, Blanchardstown-Abbotstown, Dubber, The Ward and Turnapin situated south of a line drawn along the Northern Cross Route (M50), passing in a clockwise direction around and including roundabout No. 3 at the junction of the Northern Cross Route (M50) with the M1 Motorway.	Transfer of Botanic A, B and C and Drumcondra South C to Dublin Central.
2024–	3	In the city of Dublin, the electoral divisions of Ballygall A, Ballygall B, Ballygall C, Ballygall D, Ballymun A, Ballymun B, Ballymun C, Ballymun D, Ballymun E, Ballymun F, Beaumont A, Beaumont B, Beaumont F, Finglas North A, Finglas North B, Finglas North C, Finglas South A, Finglas South B, Finglas South C, Finglas South D, Kilmore A, Whitehall A, Whitehall B, Whitehall C, Whitehall D.	Transfer of Beaumont B, Beaumont F and Kilmore A from Dublin Bay North; transfer of the remainder of Blanchardstown-Abbotstown and The Ward to Dublin West; and transfer of the remainder of Airport, Dubber and Turnapin to Dublin Fingal West.

== TDs ==
=== TDs 1921–1923 ===
Teachtaí Dála (TDs) for Dublin North-West 1921–1923
Key to parties: SF = Sinn Féin; PT-SF = Sinn Féin (Pro-Treaty)
Dáil	Election	Deputy (Party)	Deputy (Party)	Deputy (Party)	Deputy (Party)
2nd	1921	Philip Cosgrave (SF)	Joseph McGrath (SF)	Richard Mulcahy (SF)	Michael Staines (SF)
3rd	1922	Philip Cosgrave (PT-SF)	Joseph McGrath (PT-SF)	Richard Mulcahy (PT-SF)	Michael Staines (PT-SF)
4th	1923	Constituency abolished. See Dublin North			

Note: The columns in this table are used only for presentational purposes, and no significance should be attached to the order of columns. For details of the order in which seats were won at each election, see the detailed results of that election.

=== TDs 1937–1977 ===
Teachtaí Dála (TDs) for Dublin North-West 1937–1977
Key to parties: CnaP = Clann na Poblachta; FF = Fianna Fáil; FG = Fine Gael; Ind. = Independent; Lab = Labour
Dáil	Election	Deputy (Party)	Deputy (Party)	Deputy (Party)	Deputy (Party)	Deputy (Party)
9th	1937	Seán T. O'Kelly (FF)	A. P. Byrne (Ind.)	Cormac Breathnach (FF)	Patrick McGilligan (FG)	Archie Heron (Lab)
10th	1938	Seán T. O'Kelly (FF)	A. P. Byrne (Ind.)	Cormac Breathnach (FF)	Patrick McGilligan (FG)	Eamonn Cooney (FF)
11th	1943	Seán T. O'Kelly (FF)	A. P. Byrne (Ind.)	Cormac Breathnach (FF)	Patrick McGilligan (FG)	Martin O'Sullivan (Lab)
12th	1944	Seán T. O'Kelly (FF)	John S. O'Connor (FF)	Cormac Breathnach (FF)	Patrick McGilligan (FG)	Martin O'Sullivan (Lab)
12th	1945 by-election	Vivion de Valera (FF)	John S. O'Connor (FF)	Cormac Breathnach (FF)	Patrick McGilligan (FG)	Martin O'Sullivan (Lab)
13th	1948	Mick Fitzpatrick (CnaP)	A. P. Byrne (Ind.)	Cormac Breathnach (FF)	3 seats from 1948 to 1969	
14th	1951	Declan Costello (FG)	A. P. Byrne (Ind.)	Cormac Breathnach (FF)	3 seats from 1948 to 1969	
14th	1952 by-election	Declan Costello (FG)	Thomas Byrne (Ind.)	Cormac Breathnach (FF)	3 seats from 1948 to 1969	
15th	1954	Declan Costello (FG)	Thomas Byrne (Ind.)	Richard Gogan (FF)	3 seats from 1948 to 1969	
16th	1957	Declan Costello (FG)	Thomas Byrne (Ind.)	Richard Gogan (FF)	3 seats from 1948 to 1969	
17th	1961	Declan Costello (FG)	Michael Mullen (Lab)	Richard Gogan (FF)	3 seats from 1948 to 1969	
18th	1965	Declan Costello (FG)	Michael Mullen (Lab)	Richard Gogan (FF)	3 seats from 1948 to 1969	
19th	1969	Hugh Byrne (FG)	Jim Tunney (FF)	Richard Gogan (FF)	David Thornley (Lab)	4 seats from 1969 to 1977
20th	1973	Hugh Byrne (FG)	Jim Tunney (FF)	Richard Gogan (FF)	David Thornley (Lab)	4 seats from 1969 to 1977
21st	1977	Constituency abolished. See Dublin Finglas and Dublin Cabra				

Note: The columns in this table are used only for presentational purposes, and no significance should be attached to the order of columns. For details of the order in which seats were won at each election, see the detailed results of that election.

=== TDs since 1981 ===
Teachtaí Dála (TDs) for Dublin North-West 1981–
Key to parties: DL = Democratic Left; FF = Fianna Fáil; FG = Fine Gael; Lab = Labour; SF = Sinn Féin; SD = Social Democrats; WP = Workers' Party
Dáil	Election	Deputy (Party)	Deputy (Party)	Deputy (Party)	Deputy (Party)
22nd	1981	Jim Tunney (FF)	Michael Barrett (FF)	Mary Flaherty (FG)	Hugh Byrne (FG)
23rd	1982 (Feb)	Jim Tunney (FF)	Michael Barrett (FF)	Mary Flaherty (FG)	Proinsias De Rossa (WP)
24th	1982 (Nov)	Jim Tunney (FF)	Michael Barrett (FF)	Mary Flaherty (FG)	Proinsias De Rossa (WP)
25th	1987	Jim Tunney (FF)	Michael Barrett (FF)	Mary Flaherty (FG)	Proinsias De Rossa (WP)
26th	1989	Jim Tunney (FF)	Michael Barrett (FF)	Mary Flaherty (FG)	Proinsias De Rossa (WP)
27th	1992	Noel Ahern (FF)	Róisín Shortall (Lab)	Mary Flaherty (FG)	Proinsias De Rossa (DL)
28th	1997	Noel Ahern (FF)	Róisín Shortall (Lab)	Pat Carey (FF)	Proinsias De Rossa (DL)
29th	2002	Noel Ahern (FF)	Róisín Shortall (Lab)	Pat Carey (FF)	3 seats from 2002
30th	2007	Noel Ahern (FF)	Róisín Shortall (Lab)	Pat Carey (FF)	3 seats from 2002
31st	2011	Dessie Ellis (SF)	Róisín Shortall (Lab)	John Lyons (Lab)	3 seats from 2002
32nd	2016	Dessie Ellis (SF)	Róisín Shortall (SD)	Noel Rock (FG)	3 seats from 2002
33rd	2020	Dessie Ellis (SF)	Róisín Shortall (SD)	Paul McAuliffe (FF)	3 seats from 2002
34th	2024	Dessie Ellis (SF)	Rory Hearne (SD)	Paul McAuliffe (FF)	3 seats from 2002

Note: The columns in this table are used only for presentational purposes, and no significance should be attached to the order of columns. For details of the order in which seats were won at each election, see the detailed results of that election.

== Elections ==
*: Outgoing TD

=== 2024 general election ===
2024 general election: Dublin North-West
Party	Candidate	FPv%	Count								
Party	Candidate	FPv%	1	2	3	4	5	6	7	8	9
Sinn Féin	Dessie Ellis	17.0	5,562	5,669	5,690	5,727	5,832	6,015	6,545	7,423	7,562
Social Democrats	Rory Hearne	14.1	4,631	4,699	4,984	5,491	5,522	5,688	5,883	7,423	8,400
Sinn Féin	Cathleen Carney Boud	13.8	4,503	4,552	4,579	4,648	4,696	4,830	5,139	5,832	5,987
Fianna Fáil	Paul McAuliffe	13.6	4,463	4,491	4,574	4,722	4,739	4,913	5,037	5,259	8,189
Fine Gael	Noel Rock	11.9	3,893	3,914	4,018	4,188	4,205	4,309	4,387	4,569	
PBP–Solidarity	Conor Reddy (Note: Reddy is a member of People Before Profit.)	8.9	2,917	3,039	3,125	3,227	3,378	3,568	4,199		
Independent	Gavin Pepper	5.6	1,820	1,935	1,946	1,957	2,557	3,087			
Aontú	Edward McManus	4.2	1,367	1,415	1,443	1,469	1,658				
National Party	Stephen Redmond	3.7	1,209	1,239	1,242	1,243					
Green	Caroline Conroy	2.9	943	959	1,091						
Labour	John Nisbet	2.4	779	791							
Independent	Diarmuid Mac Dubhghlais	1.4	463								
Centre Party	Ian Croft	0.5	183								
Electorate: 58,462 Valid: 32,733 Spoilt: 300 Quota: 8,184 Turnout: 56.5%

=== 2020 general election ===
2020 general election: Dublin North-West
Party	Candidate	FPv%	Count					
Party	Candidate	FPv%	1	2	3	4	5	6
Sinn Féin	Dessie Ellis	44.4	14,375					
Social Democrats	Róisín Shortall	18.9	6,124	7,896	7,990	8,148		
Fianna Fáil	Paul McAuliffe	12.0	3,902	4,304	4,341	4,456	5,061	7,403
Fine Gael	Noel Rock	11.1	3,579	3,698	3,732	3,749	4,638	
Green	Caroline Conroy	4.8	1,548	2,101	2,204	2,291		
Solidarity–PBP	Conor Reddy (Note: Reddy was a member of People Before Profit.)	3.8	1,215	3,681	3,870	4,081	5,497	6,308
Labour	Andrew Montague	2.6	848	1,149	1,204	1,240		
National Party	Stephen Redmond	1.5	471	776	850			
Independent	Ian Croft	0.6	209	448				
Independent	Niall Fitzgerald	0.4	115	236				
Electorate: 52,823 Valid: 32,386 Spoilt: 343 (1.0%) Quota: 8,097 Turnout: 32,729 (62.0%)

=== 2016 general election ===
2016 general election: Dublin North-West
Party	Candidate	FPv%	Count								
Party	Candidate	FPv%	1	2	3	4	5	6	7	8	9
Social Democrats	Róisín Shortall	28.5	10,540								
Sinn Féin	Dessie Ellis	20.5	7,571	7,724	7,847	7,884	8,358	8,924	11,638		
Fianna Fáil	Paul McAuliffe	12.8	4,750	4,962	5,018	5,124	5,207	5,401	5,514	5,941	6,907
Fine Gael	Noel Rock	12.5	4,642	4,841	4,878	5,072	5,102	5,247	5,287	5,431	7,563
Labour	John Lyons	7.4	2,750	2,956	3,038	3,339	3,420	3,739	3,852	4,281	
Sinn Féin	Cathleen Carney Boud	6.6	2,437	2,507	2,572	2,642	2,783	3,325			
AAA–PBP	Andrew Keegan	3.9	1,434	1,603	1,865	2,067	2,585				
Independent	Bernie Hughes	3.0	1,120	1,182	1,346	1,455					
Green	Caroline Conroy	2.5	915	1,030	1,120						
Workers' Party	Jimmy Dignam	1.9	692	763							
Direct Democracy	Cormac McKay	0.4	158	188							
Electorate: 60,406 Valid: 37,009 Spoilt: 463 (1.2%) Quota: 9,253 Turnout: 37,472 (62.0%)

=== 2011 general election ===
2011 general election: Dublin North-West
Party	Candidate	FPv%	Count						
Party	Candidate	FPv%	1	2	3	4	5	6	7
Labour	Róisín Shortall	28.5	9,359						
Sinn Féin	Dessie Ellis	21.7	7,115	7,216	7,229	7,243	7,871	8,119	8,973
Labour	John Lyons	14.6	4,799	5,514	5,525	5,562	6,194	6,668	7,837
Fianna Fáil	Pat Carey	11.8	3,869	3,934	3,955	3,966	4,124	4,350	
Fine Gael	Gerry Breen	9.1	2,988	3,083	3,118	3,132	3,247	4,910	5,802
Fine Gael	Bill Tormey	7.6	2,508	2,623	2,636	2,648	2,780		
People Before Profit	Andrew Keegan (Note: Keegan campaigned as a member of the United Left Alliance.)	2.1	677	697	716	749			
Independent	Sean Mooney	1.3	433	444	455	539			
Workers' Party	John Dunne	1.1	345	355	362	371			
Green	Ruari Holohan	1.0	328	342	348	358			
New Vision	Michael J. Loftus (Note: New Vision was an electoral alliance of independent non-party candidates and did not appear on the ballot.)	0.7	217	225	245				
Christian Solidarity	Michael Larkin	0.5	173	175					
Electorate: 49,269 Valid: 32,811 Spoilt: 451 (1.4%) Quota: 8,203 Turnout: 33,262 (67.5%)

=== 2007 general election ===
2007 general election: Dublin North-West
Party	Candidate	FPv%	Count		
Party	Candidate	FPv%	1	2	3
Fianna Fáil	Noel Ahern	25.6	7,913		
Fianna Fáil	Pat Carey	23.3	7,211	7,439	7,850
Labour	Róisín Shortall	20.3	6,286	6,964	9,255
Sinn Féin	Dessie Ellis	15.7	4,873	5,251	5,657
Fine Gael	Bill Tormey	10.0	3,083	3,291	
Green	Declan Fitzgerald	2.7	853		
Irish Socialist Network	John O'Neill	1.6	505		
Workers' Party	Owen Martin	0.8	240		
Electorate: 51,951 Valid: 30,964 Spoilt: 423 (1.4%) Quota: 7,742 Turnout: 31,387 (60.4%)

=== 2002 general election ===
2002 general election: Dublin North-West
Party	Candidate	FPv%	Count					
Party	Candidate	FPv%	1	2	3	4	5	6
Fianna Fáil	Noel Ahern	26.4	6,912					
Fianna Fáil	Pat Carey	21.1	5,523	5,565	5,827	5,906	5,968	6,599
Sinn Féin	Dessie Ellis	18.3	4,781	4,799	4,825	4,993	5,098	5,602
Labour	Róisín Shortall	16.8	4,391	4,400	4,443	4,629	4,915	6,932
Fine Gael	Brendan Brady	7.9	2,082	2,100	2,120	2,145	2,203	
Independent	Bill Tormey	4.2	1,100	1,128	1,137	1,205	1,351	
Green	Eugene O'Brien	2.3	607	629	635	704		
Workers' Party	Seán Ó Cionnaith	2.3	608	614	620			
Christian Solidarity	Michael Larkin	0.6	154					
Electorate: 47,641 Valid: 26,158 Spoilt: 385 (1.5%) Quota: 6,540 Turnout: 26,543 (55.7%)

=== 1997 general election ===
1997 general election: Dublin North-West
Party	Candidate	FPv%	Count									
Party	Candidate	FPv%	1	2	3	4	5	6	7	8	9	10
Fianna Fáil	Noel Ahern	30.2	11,075									
Fianna Fáil	Pat Carey	16.9	6,188	9,041								
Labour	Róisín Shortall	11.1	4,084	4,252	4,460	4,475	4,556	4,734	4,914	5,406	6,031	6,970
Democratic Left	Proinsias De Rossa	10.1	3,701	3,840	3,982	3,997	4,083	4,207	4,416	4,774	5,347	5,933
Fine Gael	Brendan Brady	7.9	2,901	3,061	3,156	3,165	3,180	3,274	3,383	3,563	3,969	5,833
Fine Gael	Mary Flaherty	7.7	2,825	2,910	3,016	3,027	3,054	3,111	3,271	3,463	3,849	
Independent	Bill Tormey	4.0	1,479	1,558	1,818	1,840	1,917	2,121	2,657	3,266		
Green	Tom Simpson	4.2	1,525	1,603	1,858	1,896	1,993	2,270	2,462			
Independent	Tony Taaffe	3.2	1,171	1,266	1,700	1,713	1,755	1,931				
National Party	Joe MacDonough	1.7	614	635	703	719	740					
Independent	Kathleen Maher	1.3	479	505	544	593	651					
Workers' Party	John Dunne	1.3	489	511	547	561						
Independent	T. J. Fay	0.2	82	87	110							
Independent	Gerard Doolan	0.2	73	76	107							
Independent	Maria McCool	0.1	13	14	18							
Electorate: 60,374 Valid: 36,699 Spoilt: 504 (1.4%) Quota: 7,340 Turnout: 37,203 (61.6%)

=== 1992 general election ===
1992 general election: Dublin North-West
Party	Candidate	FPv%	Count											
Party	Candidate	FPv%	1	2	3	4	5	6	7	8	9	10	11	12
Labour	Róisín Shortall	23.1	8,634											
Fianna Fáil	Noel Ahern	15.4	5,748	5,811	5,819	5,836	5,842	5,855	5,973	6,030	6,100	6,187	7,609	
Fine Gael	Mary Flaherty	12.3	4,615	4,821	4,853	4,868	4,901	4,912	5,018	5,061	5,148	5,315	5,533	6,382
Democratic Left	Proinsias De Rossa	12.2	4,562	4,889	4,913	4,983	5,048	5,108	5,149	5,273	5,659	6,047	6,243	7,704
Fianna Fáil	Pat Carey	9.9	3,693	3,729	3,741	3,749	3,770	3,776	3,849	3,964	3,991	4,059	5,205	5,732
Fianna Fáil	Jim Tunney	8.2	3,054	3,082	3,087	3,096	3,107	3,116	3,190	3,230	3,271	3,338		
Independent	Bill Tormey	6.7	2,515	2,797	2,824	2,880	2,921	2,950	3,051	3,167	3,364	3,637	3,842	
Green	John Murphy	2.4	897	951	977	1,018	1,043	1,076	1,191	1,357	1,494			
Workers' Party	Eamonn O'Brien	2.1	801	844	851	923	1,174	1,221	1,240	1,329				
Christian Centrist	Joe MacDonough	2.0	741	750	757	772	774	779						
Sinn Féin	Harry Fleming	1.9	694	709	719	725	739	1,042	1,061					
Sinn Féin	Eileen Murphy	1.4	508	521	528	562	564							
Workers' Party	Lucia O'Neill	1.2	432	474	477	493								
Independent	Desmond O'Malley	1.0	358	377	393									
Independent	Gerard Doolan	0.4	161	168										
Independent	John Olohan	0.1	25	27										
Electorate: 58,396 Valid: 37,438 Spoilt: 728 (1.9%) Quota: 7,488 Turnout: 38,166 (65.4%)

=== 1989 general election ===
1989 general election: Dublin North-West
Party	Candidate	FPv%	Count								
Party	Candidate	FPv%	1	2	3	4	5	6	7	8	9
Workers' Party	Proinsias De Rossa	26.7	7,976								
Fianna Fáil	Jim Tunney	17.8	5,315	5,455	5,455	5,502	5,532	5,692	5,881	6,103	
Fianna Fáil	Michael Barrett	17.6	5,277	5,390	5,400	5,546	5,593	5,663	5,848	5,985	6,037
Fine Gael	Mary Flaherty	10.4	3,100	3,257	3,266	3,351	4,528	4,584	4,844	5,061	5,080
Labour	Bill Tormey	8.2	2,462	2,706	2,726	2,890	2,958	3,202	3,656	4,980	5,026
Fine Gael	Tom Farrell	4.5	1,334	1,385	1,396	1,454					
Green	Alison Michelle Larkin	4.4	1,327	1,456	1,476	1,611	1,662	2,003			
Sinn Féin	Harry Fleming	4.2	1,255	1,362	1,372	1,485	1,502				
Independent	Joan Byrne	3.0	897	975	1002						
Workers' Party	Lucia O'Neill	2.9	853	1,802	1,844	2,013	2,040	2,305	2,811		
Independent	Gerard Doolan	0.4	130	152							
Electorate: 48,492 Valid: 29,926 Quota: 5,986 Turnout: 61.7%

=== 1987 general election ===
1987 general election: Dublin North-West
Party	Candidate	FPv%	Count												
Party	Candidate	FPv%	1	2	3	4	5	6	7	8	9	10	11	12	13
Workers' Party	Proinsias De Rossa	19.8	6,866	6,867	6,894	6,916	7,051								
Fianna Fáil	Michael Barrett	19.4	6,698	6,701	6,704	6,716	6,749	6,825	6,836	7,070					
Fianna Fáil	Jim Tunney	19.0	6,591	6,592	6,598	6,612	6,640	6,685	6,697	6,777	6,951				
Fine Gael	Mary Flaherty	13.5	4,662	4,662	4,671	4,676	4,759	4,803	4,821	4,922	4,964	4,978	5,620	5,621	7,709
Fianna Fáil	Pat Carey	10.0	3,448	3,449	3,453	3,459	3,482	3,529	3,534	3,609	3,818	3,927	4,315	4,339	4,430
Fine Gael	Thomas Farrell	5.3	1,831	1,832	1,841	1,846	1,873	1,900	1,905	1,989	2,019	2,028	2,299	2,299	
Labour	Bill Tormey	4.0	1,370	1,373	1,377	1,379	1,442	1,599	1,631	1,790	1,970	1,983			
Independent	Agnes Cox	2.4	844	851	874	884	936	988	1,006						
Sinn Féin	Harry Fleming	1.9	642	642	645	972	985	1,038	1,050	1,133					
Workers' Party	Philomena Donnelly	1.8	614	616	618	636	674								
Green	Alison Larkin	1.5	504	511	518	521									
Sinn Féin	Niall Donnelly	1.2	423	424	426										
Independent	Gerard Doolan	0.3	95	100											
Independent	Barbara Hyland	0.1	33												
Electorate: 52,182 Valid: 34,621 Quota: 6,925 Turnout: 66.3%

=== November 1982 general election ===
November 1982 general election: Dublin North-West
Party	Candidate	FPv%	Count									
Party	Candidate	FPv%	1	2	3	4	5	6	7	8	9	10
Fianna Fáil	Jim Tunney	20.2	6,408									
Workers' Party	Proinsias De Rossa	19.8	6,291	6,306	6,345	6,400						
Fine Gael	Mary Flaherty	14.8	4,692	4,703	4,731	4,744	4,776	4,840	4,842	6,016	6,982	
Fianna Fáil	Michael Barrett	12.8	4,080	4,083	4,108	4,130	4,157	4,198	4,222	4,279	4,484	6,632
Fine Gael	Hugh Byrne	9.3	2,972	2,976	2,986	2,992	3,012	3,062	3,063	3,687	4,249	4,485
Fianna Fáil	Timothy Killeen	7.2	2,290	2,293	2,303	2,325	2,342	2,423	2,439	2,475	2,641	
Labour	Brendan Halligan	6.5	2,053	2,056	2,077	2,109	2,173	2,264	2,265	2,393		
Fine Gael	Bill Fegan	6.2	1,983	1,986	2,005	2,019	2,045	2,071	2,073			
Independent	Richard Brady	1.1	337	340	348	359	423					
Independent	Patrick Mitchell	0.8	243	255	271	302						
Independent	Billy Keegan	0.6	198	209	222							
Independent	Michael Meagher	0.6	188	193								
Independent	Francis Maguire	0.2	74									
Electorate: 50,273 Valid: 31,809 Quota: 6,362 Turnout: 63.3%

=== February 1982 general election ===
February 1982 general election: Dublin North-West
Party	Candidate	FPv%	Count								
Party	Candidate	FPv%	1	2	3	4	5	6	7	8	9
Fianna Fáil	Jim Tunney	27.2	8,570								
Fine Gael	Mary Flaherty	14.4	4,551	4,653	4,677	5,103	5,770	6,702			
Sinn Féin The Workers' Party	Proinsias De Rossa	12.4	3,906	4,033	4,144	4,183	4,349	5,000	5,069	5,319	6,078
Fianna Fáil	Michael Barrett	12.0	3,798	4,689	4,728	4,762	4,883	5,097	5,117	8,460	
Fianna Fáil	Timothy Killeen	8.9	2,808	3,768	3,803	3,825	3,848	4,095	4,117		
Fine Gael	Hugh Byrne	7.8	2,449	2,485	2,494	2,670	3,551	4,143	4,417	4,635	5,223
Labour	Paddy Dunne	7.6	2,412	2,466	2,517	2,584	2,792				
Fine Gael	Frank Barr	5.7	1,803	1,841	1,850	2,097					
Fine Gael	Rita Boyle	3.1	984	1,004	1,017						
Independent	William Keegan	0.9	300	325							
Electorate: 48,705 Valid: 31,581 Spoilt: 370 (1.2%) Quota: 6,317 Turnout: 31,951 (65.6%)

=== 1981 general election ===
1981 general election: Dublin North-West
Party	Candidate	FPv%	Count										
Party	Candidate	FPv%	1	2	3	4	5	6	7	8	9	10	11
Fianna Fáil	Jim Tunney	26.7	8,667										
Fine Gael	Mary Flaherty	12.8	4,141	4,277	4,284	4,294	4,301	4,334	4,534	5,267	5,573	5,764	6,012
Fine Gael	Hugh Byrne	12.5	4,047	4,106	4,117	4,135	4,152	4,171	4,290	5,666	5,997	6,159	6,477
Fianna Fáil	Michael Barrett	9.8	3,162	3,939	3,947	3,957	3,966	4,003	4,030	4,154	4,350	7,499	
Fianna Fáil	Timothy Killeen	8.2	2,655	3,641	3,647	3,653	3,680	3,735	3,772	3,809	3,976		
Fine Gael	Frank Barr	7.5	2,447	2,486	2,492	2,503	2,511	2,532	2,615				
Labour	Paddy Dunne	7.1	2,293	2,336	2,352	2,378	2,392	2,484	3,770	3,944	4,830	5,098	5,547
Sinn Féin The Workers' Party	Proinsias De Rossa	6.4	2,071	2,124	2,135	2,191	2,405	2,613	2,734	2,850			
Labour	Brendan Halligan	5.3	1,729	1,771	1,784	1,800	1,811	1,931					
Socialist Labour	Matt Merrigan	1.5	473	495	618	671	694						
Sinn Féin The Workers' Party	Michael Kenny	0.9	289	298	310	339							
Independent	Eamonn Farrell	0.7	236	240	246								
Socialist Labour	William Keegan	0.6	209	222									
Electorate: 48,705 Valid: 32,419 Spoilt: 474 (1.4%) Quota: 6,484 Turnout: 32,893 (67.5%)

=== 1973 general election ===
1973 general election: Dublin North-West
Party	Candidate	FPv%	Count								
Party	Candidate	FPv%	1	2	3	4	5	6	7	8	9
Fianna Fáil	Jim Tunney	23.2	7,302								
Fine Gael	Hugh Byrne	17.8	5,616	5,650	5,709	5,769	6,543				
Labour	David Thornley	15.9	5,023	5,057	5,334	5,920	6,046	7,771			
Fianna Fáil	Richard Gogan	15.0	4,723	5,182	5,270	5,294	5,334	5,365	5,373	5,439	7,703
Fianna Fáil	Fergus Keely	6.3	1,999	2,420	2,462	2,471	2,501	2,535	2,538	2,565	
Fine Gael	Peter Sutherland	6.2	1,969	1,979	2,013	2,068	2,543	2,729	2,951	3,773	3,839
Labour	Michael McEvoy	5.3	1,666	1,671	1,737	2,111	2,165				
Fine Gael	Patrick McDonnell	4.6	1,457	1,469	1,495	1,522					
Labour	Jimmy Somers	3.4	1,086	1,094	1,155						
Aontacht Éireann	Fintan Murray	2.2	705	714							
Electorate: 44,369 Valid: 31,546 Quota: 6,310 Turnout: 71.1%

=== 1969 general election ===
1969 general election: Dublin North-West
Party	Candidate	FPv%	Count							
Party	Candidate	FPv%	1	2	3	4	5	6	7	8
Labour	David Thornley	27.6	8,446							
Fianna Fáil	Jim Tunney	16.3	5,014	5,103	5,128	5,173	5,240	5,317	6,209	
Fianna Fáil	Richard Gogan	12.6	3,874	3,920	3,946	3,963	4,017	4,071	6,169	
Fianna Fáil	John Fallon	10.2	3,133	3,160	3,187	3,198	3,223	3,238		
Fine Gael	Hugh Byrne	8.2	2,507	2,564	2,928	2,961	3,590	3,651	3,714	6,582
Fine Gael	Michael Sweetman	7.1	2,180	2,279	2,547	2,575	3,431	3,497	3,549	
Fine Gael	Patrick McDonnell	4.5	1,392	1,427	1,734	1,758				
Labour	Michael Hopper	4.2	1,293	1,828	1,844	2,630	2,675	4,353	4,396	4,575
Fine Gael	Liam Hayes	3.5	1,067	1,088						
Labour	Thomas Watt	2.9	904	1,623	1,643	2,259	2,302			
Labour	Michael McEvoy	2.9	894	1,571	1,585					
Electorate: 43,408 Valid: 30,704 Quota: 6,141 Turnout: 70.7%

=== 1965 general election ===
1965 general election: Dublin North-West
Party	Candidate	FPv%	Count			
Party	Candidate	FPv%	1	2	3	4
Fine Gael	Declan Costello	25.0	7,074	7,158		
Labour	Michael Mullen	23.6	6,678	6,930	7,583	
Fianna Fáil	Richard Gogan	20.0	5,668	5,704	5,781	8,048
Fianna Fáil	Jim Tunney	14.9	4,220	4,261	4,328	5,138
Fianna Fáil	Michael Freeman	11.0	3,127	3,191	3,238	
Fine Gael	Patrick McDonnell	3.6	1,029	1,050		
Independent	James Phelan	1.9	526			
Electorate: 39,781 Valid: 28,322 Quota: 7,081 Turnout: 71.2%

=== 1961 general election ===
1961 general election: Dublin North-West
Party	Candidate	FPv%	Count				
Party	Candidate	FPv%	1	2	3	4	5
Fianna Fáil	Richard Gogan	25.2	5,554				
Fine Gael	Declan Costello	20.7	4,568	4,570	5,419	6,944	
Labour	Michael Mullen	18.0	3,960	3,963	4,049	4,938	5,478
Fianna Fáil	Christopher Macken	17.3	3,819	3,859	3,928	4,411	4,874
Independent	Thomas Byrne	13.4	2,955	2,958	3,088		
Fine Gael	Terence Keaney	5.3	1,159	1,161			
Electorate: 35,763 Valid: 22,015 Quota: 5,504 Turnout: 61.6%

=== 1957 general election ===
1957 general election: Dublin North-West
Party	Candidate	FPv%	Count			
Party	Candidate	FPv%	1	2	3	4
Fianna Fáil	Richard Gogan	29.3	6,004			
Fine Gael	Declan Costello	20.7	4,240	4,254	4,439	5,104
Independent	Thomas Byrne	16.7	3,427	3,480	3,828	5,135
Fianna Fáil	Christopher Macken	15.9	3,251	4,013	4,147	4,707
Labour	Michael Mullen	11.9	2,432	2,470	2,846	
Clann na Poblachta	James Slein	5.5	1,125	1,142		
Electorate: 33,306 Valid: 20,479 Quota: 5,120 Turnout: 61.5%

=== 1954 general election ===
1954 general election: Dublin North-West
Party	Candidate	FPv%	Count			
Party	Candidate	FPv%	1	2	3	4
Fine Gael	Declan Costello	32.8	7,730			
Independent	Thomas Byrne	18.2	4,286	5,785	5,907	
Fianna Fáil	Matthew Feehan	14.9	3,496	3,534	4,102	4,742
Fianna Fáil	Richard Gogan	13.8	3,247	3,273	4,286	4,847
Labour	Bhaltar Breathnach	12.9	3,033	3,288	3,337	
Fianna Fáil	Christopher Macken	7.4	1,744	1,771		
Electorate: 33,543 Valid: 23,536 Quota: 5,885 Turnout: 70.2%

=== 1952 by-election ===
Following the death of independent TD A. P. Byrne, a by-election was held on 12 November 1952. The seat was won by independent candidate Thomas Byrne, brother of the deceased TD.

1952 by-election: Dublin North-West
Party	Candidate	FPv%	Count	
Party	Candidate	FPv%	1	2
Independent	Thomas Byrne	61.1	13,078	
Fianna Fáil	Andrew Clarkin	31.0	6,629	7,075
Clann na Poblachta	MacEllistrum O'Rahilly	7.9	1,693	3,624
Electorate: 34,481 Valid: 21,400 Quota: 10,701 Turnout: 62.1%

=== 1951 general election ===
1951 general election: Dublin North-West
Party	Candidate	FPv%	Count					
Party	Candidate	FPv%	1	2	3	4	5	6
Fine Gael	Declan Costello	22.2	5,267	5,428	5,558	6,187		
Fianna Fáil	Cormac Breathnach	19.9	4,725	4,750	4,817	5,111	5,122	6,498
Independent	A. P. Byrne	18.8	4,485	4,581	4,803	5,639	5,849	6,045
Fianna Fáil	Richard Gogan	13.2	3,146	3,169	3,189	3,314	3,328	5,001
Fianna Fáil	Matthew M. Feehan	12.7	3,014	3,028	3,054	3,282	3,294	
Labour	Bhaltar Breathnach	7.2	1,700	1,774	2,307			
Labour	John Breen	4.1	963	1,012				
Clann na Poblachta	Mick Fitzpatrick	1.9	458					
Electorate: 34,246 Valid: 23,758 Quota: 5,940 Turnout: 69.4%

=== 1948 general election ===
1948 general election: Dublin North-West
Party	Candidate	FPv%	Count							
Party	Candidate	FPv%	1	2	3	4	5	6	7	8
Independent	A. P. Byrne	20.1	4,669	4,732	4,798	4,957	5,137	6,167		
Fianna Fáil	Cormac Breathnach	19.3	4,468	4,475	4,486	4,496	5,133	5,272	5,333	5,771
Fianna Fáil	Matthew Feehan	12.9	2,982	2,991	3,008	3,015	4,134	4,251	4,296	4,665
Clann na Poblachta	Mick Fitzpatrick	10.3	2,395	2,423	3,238	3,276	3,326	3,899	4,032	5,383
Fianna Fáil	Richard Gogan	8.9	2,057	2,074	2,080	2,095				
Fine Gael	William Donohoe	8.3	1,915	1,925	1,939	3,126	3,158	3,328	3,457	
Labour	James Tunney	6.8	1,576	2,130	2,171	2,210	2,266			
Fine Gael	James Ryan	6.1	1,425	1,440	1,463					
Clann na Poblachta	Edward Ward	4.2	982	998						
Labour	Kathleen McDowell	3.1	724							
Electorate: 32,779 Valid: 23,193 Quota: 5,799 Turnout: 70.8%

=== 1945 by-election ===
Following the resignation of Fianna Fáil TD Seán T. O'Kelly on his election as President of Ireland, a by-election was held on 4 December 1945. The seat was won by Vivion de Valera, son of the Taoiseach Éamon de Valera.

1945 by-election: Dublin North-West
Party	Candidate	FPv%	Count
Party	Candidate	FPv%	1
Fianna Fáil	Vivion de Valera	67.9	13,503
Labour	John Breen	32.2	6,397
Electorate: 70,331 Valid: 19,900 Quota: 9,951 Turnout: 28.3%

=== 1944 general election ===
Full figures for the last nine counts are unavailable. Ó Cuinneagáin, Brack, Cahill and Foley all lost their deposits.

1944 general election: Dublin North-West
Party	Candidate	FPv%	Count									
Party	Candidate	FPv%	1	2	3	4	5	6	7	8	9	10
Fianna Fáil	Seán T. O'Kelly	32.4	13,830									
Fine Gael	Patrick McGilligan	14.0	5,995	N/A	N/A	N/A	N/A	N/A	N/A	7,268		
Labour	Martin O'Sullivan	14.0	5,978	N/A	N/A	N/A	N/A	N/A	8,388			
Independent	A. P. Byrne	10.6	4,552	N/A	N/A	N/A	N/A	N/A	N/A	N/A	N/A	N/A
Fianna Fáil	Cormac Breathnach	7.9	3,384	N/A	N/A	7,217						
Fianna Fáil	John S. O'Connor	5.9	2,512	N/A	N/A	N/A	N/A	N/A	N/A	N/A	N/A	6,853
Fianna Fáil	Eamonn Cooney	5.4	2,298	N/A								
Labour	Frank Foley	4.0	1,713	N/A								
Fine Gael	John Cahill	2.4	1,032	N/A								
Independent	Anthony Brack	1.7	746	N/A								
Ailtirí na hAiséirghe	Gearóid Ó Cuinneagáin	1.6	705	N/A								
Electorate: 68,667 Valid: 42,745 Quota: 7,125 Turnout: 62.3%

=== 1943 general election ===
Full figures for the last eleven counts are unavailable. Love, Murray, Ó Cuinneagáin, Staines, Sheppard, Keogh and Macken all lost their deposits.

1943 general election: Dublin North-West
Party	Candidate	FPv%	Count											
Party	Candidate	FPv%	1	2	3	4	5	6	7	8	9	10	11	12
Fianna Fáil	Seán T. O'Kelly	26.3	12,318											
Independent	A. P. Byrne	14.2	6,625	N/A	N/A	N/A	N/A	N/A	N/A	7,821				
Labour	Martin O'Sullivan	11.8	5,501	N/A	N/A	N/A	N/A	N/A	N/A	N/A	N/A	N/A	N/A	7,833
Fine Gael	Patrick McGilligan	10.7	5,006	N/A	N/A	N/A	N/A	N/A	N/A	N/A	N/A	N/A	N/A	7,479
Fianna Fáil	Cormac Breathnach	8.0	3,762	N/A	N/A	N/A	N/A	N/A	N/A	N/A	N/A	N/A	7,942	
Labour	Frank Foley	6.3	2,945	N/A	N/A	N/A	N/A	N/A	N/A	N/A	N/A	N/A		
Fianna Fáil	John S. O'Connor	4.3	2,014	N/A	N/A	N/A	N/A	N/A	N/A	N/A	N/A	N/A	N/A	N/A
Fianna Fáil	Seamus Davin	3.5	1,649	N/A	N/A	N/A	N/A	N/A	N/A	N/A	N/A			
Labour	Michael Keogh	3.4	1,587	N/A	N/A	N/A	N/A	N/A	N/A					
Independent	Christopher Macken	3.3	1,565	N/A	N/A	N/A	N/A	N/A	N/A	N/A				
Fine Gael	John F. Sheppard	2.6	1,230	N/A	N/A	N/A	N/A	1,548						
Fine Gael	Michael Staines	1.6	725	N/A	N/A	N/A	807							
Independent	Patrick Murray	1.3	623	N/A	648									
Ailtirí na hAiséirghe	Gearóid Ó Cuinneagáin	1.3	607	N/A	N/A	673								
Fine Gael	Michael Love	1.3	595	604										
Electorate: 68,667 Valid: 46,752 Quota: 7,793 Turnout: 68.1%

=== 1938 general election ===
1938 general election: Dublin North-West
Party	Candidate	FPv%	Count				
Party	Candidate	FPv%	1	2	3	4	5
Fianna Fáil	Seán T. O'Kelly	27.0	12,561				
Fine Gael	Patrick McGilligan	16.9	7,859				
Fianna Fáil	Eamonn Cooney	14.8	6,900	8,702			
Independent	A. P. Byrne	13.5	6,280	6,480	6,494	6,554	8,345
Labour	Archie Heron	12.3	5,715	5,919	5,923	5,937	6,514
Fianna Fáil	Cormac Breathnach	10.1	4,684	7,212	7,213	8,054	
Fine Gael	Michael Staines	5.3	2,466	2,548	2,643	2,685	
Electorate: 69,270 Valid: 46,465 Quota: 7,745 Turnout: 67.1%

=== 1937 general election ===
1937 general election: Dublin North-West
Party	Candidate	FPv%	Count							
Party	Candidate	FPv%	1	2	3	4	5	6	7	8
Fianna Fáil	Seán T. O'Kelly	27.1	12,772							
Independent	A. P. Byrne	19.2	9,030							
Labour	Archie Heron	13.3	6,287	6,524	6,710	6,741	6,809	7,433	7,490	8,389
Fine Gael	Patrick McGilligan	12.7	5,976	6,018	6,267	6,779	7,499	8,291		
Fianna Fáil	Cormac Breathnach	8.4	3,972	6,567	6,625	6,635	6,670	6,837	6,849	7,065
Fianna Fáil	Eamonn Cooney	7.9	3,707	5,578	5,640	5,651	5,671	5,899	5,906	6,073
Fine Gael	Michael Staines	3.5	1,638	1,682	1,742	2,053	2,419	2,656	3,015	
Independent	John Byrne	3.4	1,593	1,670	2,117	2,184	2,280			
Fine Gael	Peter Nugent	2.4	1,111	1,131	1,185	1,325				
Fine Gael	Vincent Rice	2.2	1,046	1,076	1,134					
Electorate: 69,174 Valid: 47,132 Quota: 7,856 Turnout: 68.1%

=== 1922 general election ===
1922 general election: Dublin North-West
Party	Candidate	FPv%	Count			
Party	Candidate	FPv%	1	2	3	4
Sinn Féin (Pro-Treaty)	Richard Mulcahy	30.1	8,351			
Sinn Féin (Pro-Treaty)	Philip Cosgrave	22.0	6,119			
Labour	J. T. O'Farrell	18.7	5,195	5,488	5,531	5,548
Sinn Féin (Pro-Treaty)	Michael Staines	18.0	4,987	5,940		
Sinn Féin (Pro-Treaty)	Joseph McGrath	11.3	3,125	4,674	5,194	5,561
Electorate: 45,827 Valid: 27,777 Quota: 5,556 Turnout: 60.6%

=== 1921 general election ===
1921 general election: Dublin North-West (uncontested)
Party	Candidate
Sinn Féin	Philip Cosgrave
Sinn Féin	Joseph McGrath
Sinn Féin	Richard Mulcahy
Sinn Féin	Michael Staines

== See also ==
- Elections in the Republic of Ireland
- Politics of the Republic of Ireland
- List of Dáil by-elections
- List of political parties in the Republic of Ireland
