= Cormac Breathnach =

Irish politician and teacher (1885–1956)

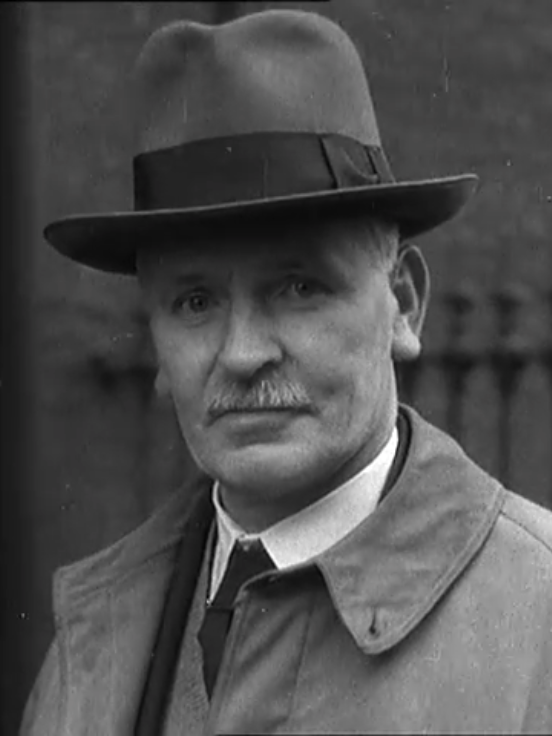
- Breathnach in 1933

Teachta Dála
- In office July 1937 – May 1954
- Constituency: Dublin North-West
- In office February 1932 – July 1937
- Constituency: Dublin North

Lord Mayor of Dublin
- In office 1949–1950
- Preceded by: John Breen
- Succeeded by: Jack Belton

Personal details
- Born: Charles Walsh; 1885 County Kerry, Ireland
- Died: 29 May 1956 (aged 70–71) Dublin, Ireland
- Party: Fianna Fáil
- Other political affiliations: National Labour Party
- Spouse(s): Kathleen Ryan; Bríd Prendergast
- Children: 2
- Education: Marlborough Training College, Dublin

Cormac Breathnach (1885 – 29 May 1956) was an Irish politician and primary school teacher.

== Early life ==
He was born in Iveragh, County Kerry in 1885, and was known in his younger years as Charlie Walsh. He was the son of Seán Breathnach, a farmer, and Cáit Breathnach (née Chonchubhair). He was educated at the local national school in Ballinakilla, County Kerry (where he was a monitor), and qualified as a national school teacher from the Marlborough Training College in Dublin.

== Teaching ==
Prior to entering politics, Breathnach was a teacher. A fluent Irish speaker, for a period he was engaged by Conradh na Gaeilge to teach the Irish language and history in a number of national schools. Breathnach was also president of Conradh na Gaeilge from 1926 until 1928. His teaching influenced some of his pupils that later figured prominently in the Irish War of Independence, including Dan Breen, Seán Treacy, Seán Hogan, and Dinny Lacey.

In his autobiography, Breen noted: "He did not confine his history lesson to the official textbook. He gave us the naked facts about the English conquest of Ireland and the manner in which our country was held in bondage. We learned about the Penal Laws, the systematic ruining of Irish trade, and the elimination of our native language. He told us also of the ruthless manner in which Irish rebellions had been crushed. By the time we had passed from his class, we were no longer content to grow up 'happy English children' as envisaged by the Board of Education".

During these years he became an active member of the Irish National Teachers' Organisation and was unanimously elected its president in 1920, and again in 1932. In 1922 he played an important part in preparing the way for the introduction of Irish as a compulsory subject in national schools.

== Politics ==
In 1926 he helped establish the Fianna Fáil party and was a member, and later chairman, of its national executive. He was first elected to Dáil Éireann at the 1932 general election. From 1932 to 1937 he served as a Fianna Fáil Teachta Dála (TD) for the Dublin North constituency. In 1937 he moved to the Dublin North-West constituency and served there until 1954. He did not contest the 1954 general election.

Breathnach served as Lord Mayor of Dublin from 1949 to 1950.

== Personal life ==
He married first Kathleen Ryan, who died young; they had two children, one of whom, Seán Breathnach, became a district judge. He later married Bríd Prendergast, a school principal, and lived most of his life in Clontarf Road, Dublin, until his death on 29 May 1956.

Civic offices
Preceded by John Breen	Lord Mayor of Dublin; 1949–1950	Succeeded by Jack Belton

Dáil	Election	Deputy (Party)	Deputy (Party)	Deputy (Party)	Deputy (Party)	Deputy (Party)	Deputy (Party)	Deputy (Party)	Deputy (Party)
4th	1923	Alfie Byrne (Ind.)	Francis Cahill (CnaG)	Margaret Collins-O'Driscoll (CnaG)	Seán McGarry (CnaG)	William Hewat (BP)	Richard Mulcahy (CnaG)	Seán T. O'Kelly (Rep)	Ernie O'Malley (Rep)
4th	1925 by-election	Alfie Byrne (Ind.)	Patrick Leonard (CnaG)	Margaret Collins-O'Driscoll (CnaG)	Oscar Traynor (Rep)	William Hewat (BP)	Richard Mulcahy (CnaG)	Seán T. O'Kelly (Rep)	Ernie O'Malley (Rep)
5th	1927 (Jun)	Alfie Byrne (Ind.)	John Byrne (CnaG)	Margaret Collins-O'Driscoll (CnaG)	Oscar Traynor (SF)	Denis Cullen (Lab)	Richard Mulcahy (CnaG)	Seán T. O'Kelly (FF)	Kathleen Clarke (FF)
6th	1927 (Sep)	Alfie Byrne (Ind.)	John Byrne (CnaG)	Margaret Collins-O'Driscoll (CnaG)	Patrick Leonard (CnaG)	James Larkin (IWL)	Richard Mulcahy (CnaG)	Seán T. O'Kelly (FF)	Eamonn Cooney (FF)
6th	1928 by-election	Alfie Byrne (Ind.)	John Byrne (CnaG)	Margaret Collins-O'Driscoll (CnaG)	Patrick Leonard (CnaG)	Vincent Rice (CnaG)	Richard Mulcahy (CnaG)	Seán T. O'Kelly (FF)	Eamonn Cooney (FF)
6th	1929 by-election	Thomas F. O'Higgins (CnaG)	John Byrne (CnaG)	Margaret Collins-O'Driscoll (CnaG)	Patrick Leonard (CnaG)	Vincent Rice (CnaG)	Richard Mulcahy (CnaG)	Seán T. O'Kelly (FF)	Eamonn Cooney (FF)
7th	1932	Alfie Byrne (Ind.)	John Byrne (CnaG)	Margaret Collins-O'Driscoll (CnaG)	Oscar Traynor (FF)	Cormac Breathnach (FF)	Richard Mulcahy (CnaG)	Seán T. O'Kelly (FF)	Eamonn Cooney (FF)
8th	1933	Alfie Byrne (Ind.)	Patrick Belton (CnaG)	Vincent Rice (CnaG)	Oscar Traynor (FF)	Cormac Breathnach (FF)	Richard Mulcahy (CnaG)	Seán T. O'Kelly (FF)	Eamonn Cooney (FF)
9th	1937	Constituency abolished. See Dublin North-East and Dublin North-West							

Dáil	Election	Deputy (Party)	Deputy (Party)	Deputy (Party)	Deputy (Party)
22nd	1981	Ray Burke (FF)	John Boland (FG)	Nora Owen (FG)	3 seats 1981–1992
23rd	1982 (Feb)	Ray Burke (FF)	John Boland (FG)	Nora Owen (FG)	3 seats 1981–1992
24th	1982 (Nov)	Ray Burke (FF)	John Boland (FG)	Nora Owen (FG)	3 seats 1981–1992
25th	1987	Ray Burke (FF)	John Boland (FG)	G. V. Wright (FF)	3 seats 1981–1992
26th	1989	Ray Burke (FF)	Nora Owen (FG)	Seán Ryan (Lab)	3 seats 1981–1992
27th	1992	Ray Burke (FF)	Nora Owen (FG)	Seán Ryan (Lab)	Trevor Sargent (GP)
28th	1997	Ray Burke (FF)	Nora Owen (FG)	G. V. Wright (FF)	Trevor Sargent (GP)
28th	1998 by-election	Seán Ryan (Lab)	Nora Owen (FG)	G. V. Wright (FF)	Trevor Sargent (GP)
29th	2002	Seán Ryan (Lab)	Jim Glennon (FF)	G. V. Wright (FF)	Trevor Sargent (GP)
30th	2007	James Reilly (FG)	Michael Kennedy (FF)	Darragh O'Brien (FF)	Trevor Sargent (GP)
31st	2011	James Reilly (FG)	Alan Farrell (FG)	Brendan Ryan (Lab)	Clare Daly (SP)
32nd	2016	Constituency abolished. See Dublin Fingal			

Dáil	Election	Deputy (Party)	Deputy (Party)	Deputy (Party)	Deputy (Party)
2nd	1921	Philip Cosgrave (SF)	Joseph McGrath (SF)	Richard Mulcahy (SF)	Michael Staines (SF)
3rd	1922	Philip Cosgrave (PT-SF)	Joseph McGrath (PT-SF)	Richard Mulcahy (PT-SF)	Michael Staines (PT-SF)
4th	1923	Constituency abolished. See Dublin North			

Dáil	Election	Deputy (Party)	Deputy (Party)	Deputy (Party)	Deputy (Party)	Deputy (Party)
9th	1937	Seán T. O'Kelly (FF)	A. P. Byrne (Ind.)	Cormac Breathnach (FF)	Patrick McGilligan (FG)	Archie Heron (Lab)
10th	1938	Seán T. O'Kelly (FF)	A. P. Byrne (Ind.)	Cormac Breathnach (FF)	Patrick McGilligan (FG)	Eamonn Cooney (FF)
11th	1943	Seán T. O'Kelly (FF)	A. P. Byrne (Ind.)	Cormac Breathnach (FF)	Patrick McGilligan (FG)	Martin O'Sullivan (Lab)
12th	1944	Seán T. O'Kelly (FF)	John S. O'Connor (FF)	Cormac Breathnach (FF)	Patrick McGilligan (FG)	Martin O'Sullivan (Lab)
12th	1945 by-election	Vivion de Valera (FF)	John S. O'Connor (FF)	Cormac Breathnach (FF)	Patrick McGilligan (FG)	Martin O'Sullivan (Lab)
13th	1948	Mick Fitzpatrick (CnaP)	A. P. Byrne (Ind.)	Cormac Breathnach (FF)	3 seats from 1948 to 1969	
14th	1951	Declan Costello (FG)	A. P. Byrne (Ind.)	Cormac Breathnach (FF)	3 seats from 1948 to 1969	
14th	1952 by-election	Declan Costello (FG)	Thomas Byrne (Ind.)	Cormac Breathnach (FF)	3 seats from 1948 to 1969	
15th	1954	Declan Costello (FG)	Thomas Byrne (Ind.)	Richard Gogan (FF)	3 seats from 1948 to 1969	
16th	1957	Declan Costello (FG)	Thomas Byrne (Ind.)	Richard Gogan (FF)	3 seats from 1948 to 1969	
17th	1961	Declan Costello (FG)	Michael Mullen (Lab)	Richard Gogan (FF)	3 seats from 1948 to 1969	
18th	1965	Declan Costello (FG)	Michael Mullen (Lab)	Richard Gogan (FF)	3 seats from 1948 to 1969	
19th	1969	Hugh Byrne (FG)	Jim Tunney (FF)	Richard Gogan (FF)	David Thornley (Lab)	4 seats from 1969 to 1977
20th	1973	Hugh Byrne (FG)	Jim Tunney (FF)	Richard Gogan (FF)	David Thornley (Lab)	4 seats from 1969 to 1977
21st	1977	Constituency abolished. See Dublin Finglas and Dublin Cabra				

Dáil	Election	Deputy (Party)	Deputy (Party)	Deputy (Party)	Deputy (Party)
22nd	1981	Jim Tunney (FF)	Michael Barrett (FF)	Mary Flaherty (FG)	Hugh Byrne (FG)
23rd	1982 (Feb)	Jim Tunney (FF)	Michael Barrett (FF)	Mary Flaherty (FG)	Proinsias De Rossa (WP)
24th	1982 (Nov)	Jim Tunney (FF)	Michael Barrett (FF)	Mary Flaherty (FG)	Proinsias De Rossa (WP)
25th	1987	Jim Tunney (FF)	Michael Barrett (FF)	Mary Flaherty (FG)	Proinsias De Rossa (WP)
26th	1989	Jim Tunney (FF)	Michael Barrett (FF)	Mary Flaherty (FG)	Proinsias De Rossa (WP)
27th	1992	Noel Ahern (FF)	Róisín Shortall (Lab)	Mary Flaherty (FG)	Proinsias De Rossa (DL)
28th	1997	Noel Ahern (FF)	Róisín Shortall (Lab)	Pat Carey (FF)	Proinsias De Rossa (DL)
29th	2002	Noel Ahern (FF)	Róisín Shortall (Lab)	Pat Carey (FF)	3 seats from 2002
30th	2007	Noel Ahern (FF)	Róisín Shortall (Lab)	Pat Carey (FF)	3 seats from 2002
31st	2011	Dessie Ellis (SF)	Róisín Shortall (Lab)	John Lyons (Lab)	3 seats from 2002
32nd	2016	Dessie Ellis (SF)	Róisín Shortall (SD)	Noel Rock (FG)	3 seats from 2002
33rd	2020	Dessie Ellis (SF)	Róisín Shortall (SD)	Paul McAuliffe (FF)	3 seats from 2002
34th	2024	Dessie Ellis (SF)	Rory Hearne (SD)	Paul McAuliffe (FF)	3 seats from 2002
