= James Ryan (rugby union, born 1917) =

Irish rugby union player

- Full name: James Gerard Ryan
- Born: 1 April 1917 Dublin, Ireland
- Died: July 1978 (aged 61)

Rugby union career
- Position: Lock / Prop
International career
Years	Team	Apps	(Points)
1939	Ireland	3	(0)

James Gerard Ryan (1 April 1917 — July 1978) was an Irish international rugby union player.

A Dublin-born forward, Ryan played his rugby primarily across the second row and was fast in open play, as well as a capable goal-kicker. He competed for University College Dublin RFC and was utilised as a prop in his three caps for Ireland, playing all of their 1939 Home Nations matches.

Ryan stood unsuccessfully in the 1948 Irish general election, as a candidate for Fine Gael in Dublin North-West.

== See also ==
- List of Ireland national rugby union players
