= John Breen (Irish politician) =

Irish politician

Lord Mayor of Dublin
- In office 1948–1949
- Preceded by: Patrick Cahill
- Succeeded by: Cormac Breathnach

Personal details
- Party: Labour Party

John Breen was an Irish Labour Party politician. He was a member of Dublin Corporation, and served as Lord Mayor of Dublin from 1948 to 1949.

He was an unsuccessful Labour Party candidate for the Dublin North-West constituency at the 1945 by-election, and at the 1951 general election.

Civic offices
Preceded by Patrick Cahill	Lord Mayor of Dublin; 1948–1949	Succeeded by Cormac Breathnach
