= Dessie Ellis =

Irish politician (born 1953)

Dessie Ellis TD
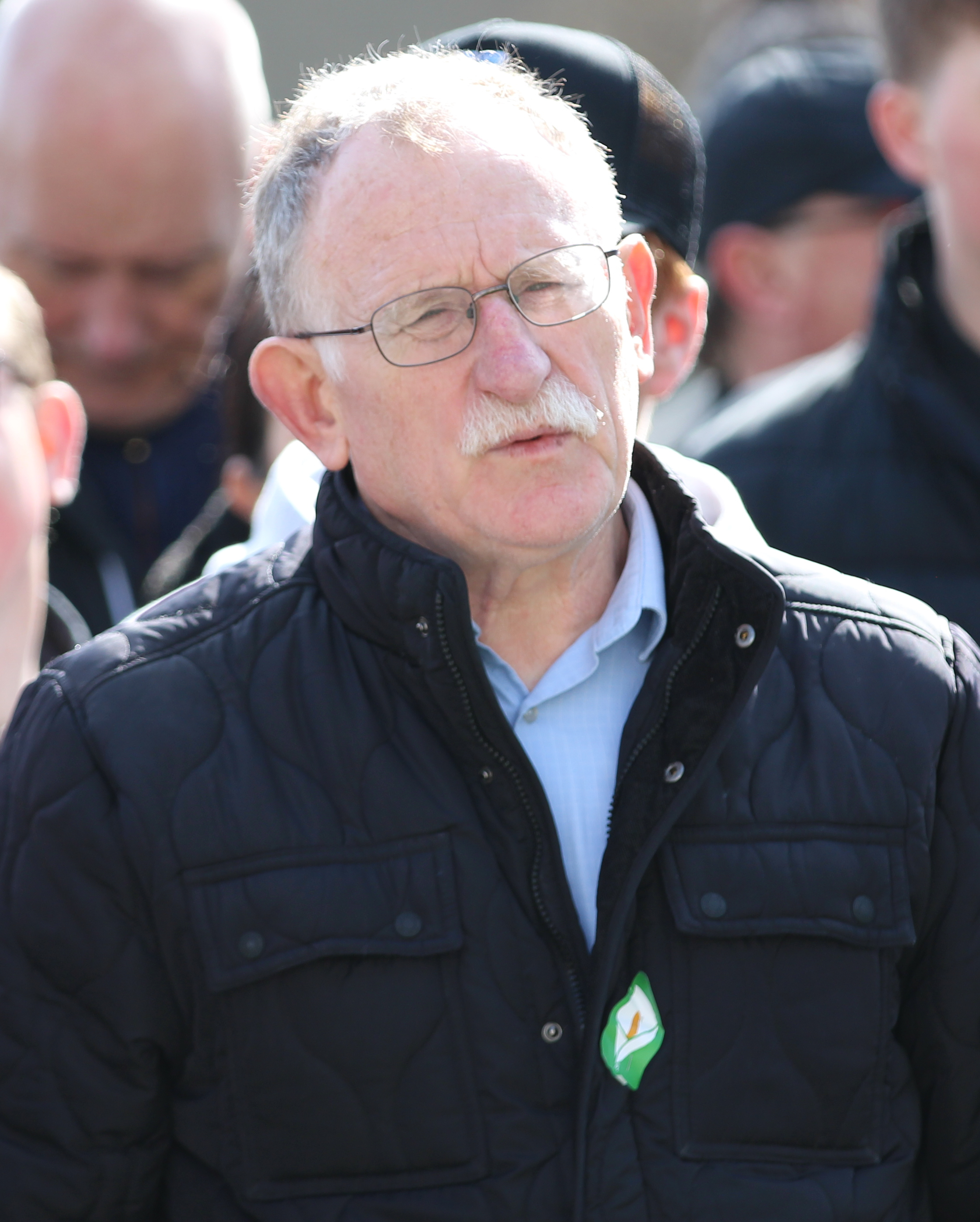
- Ellis in 2024

Teachta Dála
- Incumbent
- Assumed office February 2011
- Constituency: Dublin North-West

Dublin City Councillor
- In office 1999–2011
- Constituency: Finglas

Personal details
- Born: Desmond Ellis; 23 September 1953 (age 72) Ballymun, Dublin, Ireland
- Party: Sinn Féin
- Education: Dublin Institute of Technology
- Website: dessieellis.ie

Military service
- Paramilitary: Provisional Irish Republican Army
- Years of service: 1970s–1990s

Desmond Ellis (born 23 September 1953) is an Irish Sinn Féin politician who has been a Teachta Dála (TD) for the Dublin North-West constituency since the 2011 general election. During the 1970s and 1980s Ellis was a member of the Provisional IRA until his arrest in Ireland in 1981. Ellis subsequently fled Ireland before being recaptured in the United States and returned to Irish authorities.

In 1983 Ellis was found guilty of possessing materials used to make explosive devices for the IRA and was sentenced to 10 years imprisonment by an Irish court. In 1990 Ellis was the first person extradited from the Republic of Ireland to the United Kingdom under the 1987 Extradition Act, on charges of terrorism on charges related to the 1982 Hyde Park and Regent's Park bombings as well as the 1983 Harrods bombing, however Ellis was acquitted of these charges in 1991. Ellis moved into constitutional politics in 1999 when he was elected to Dublin City Council, a position he held until he was elected to his current position as a TD.

== Early life ==
Ellis was born in Finglas in 1953. He is from an Irish republican family, and both of his grandfathers fought in the Easter Rising in 1916. He later owned a television repair business.

== Extradition and prison term ==
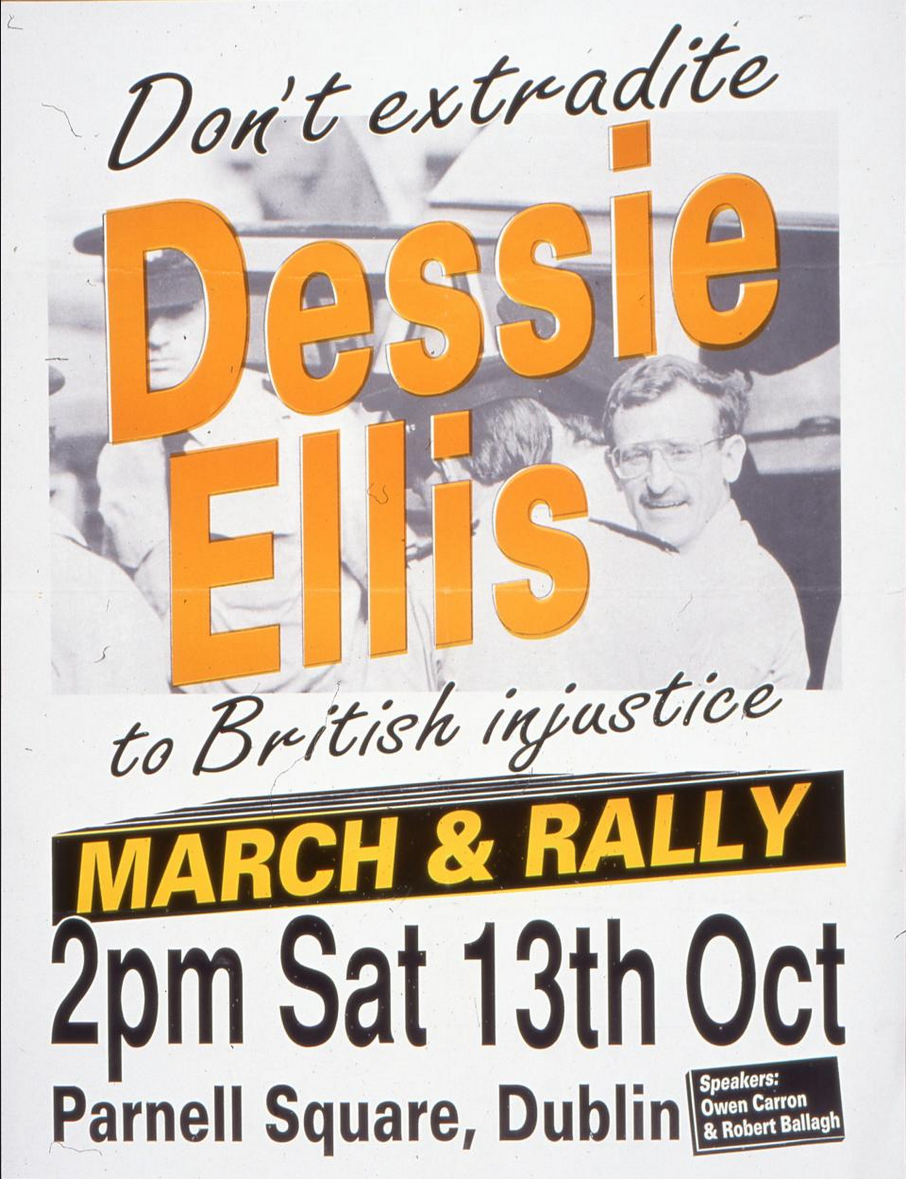
A poster from October 1990 promoting a march against Ellis' extradition

He is a former Provisional IRA prisoner. He was arrested in 1981, when explosives and bomb making equipment were found under his bed. He was charged with possession of explosives. He jumped bail, but was arrested in Buffalo, New York in February 1982 and extradited to the Republic of Ireland, where in April 1983, he was sentenced to ten years' imprisonment in Portlaoise Prison. He was convicted of possessing multiple power-timer units for IRA bombs, including those suspected of being used in the Hyde Park and Regent's Park bombings. In 1983, Ellis' fingerprints were found on a huge cache of IRA explosives found in a forest outside the Berkshire town of Pangbourne. The cache was linked to the Harrods and Hyde Park bombings. On 14 November 1990, after thirty-five days on hunger-strike, Ellis became the first person extradited from the Republic of Ireland to the United Kingdom under the 1987 Extradition Act. He went on hunger strike to protest efforts to send him to Britain, but was extradited in the sixth week of his fast. Ellis's hunger strike drew considerable domestic and international attention, and at one point Taoiseach Charles Haughey intervened, asking Ellis' parents to ask him to give it up, but they refused. Ellis was acquitted at his trial in London in October 1991.

== Political career ==
Ellis was first elected to Dublin City Council in 1999, for the Finglas local electoral area. He unsuccessfully contested the 2002 general election in the Dublin North-West constituency, and received 4,781 first preference votes (18.3%). He was again unsuccessful at the 2007 general election in the same constituency, receiving 4,873 votes (15.7%).

At the 2011 general election, he was elected to the 31st Dáil with 7,115 (21.7%) of the first-preference votes.

In October 2014, following claims made by Mairia Cahill that she had been raped as a 17-year-old by a member of the Provisional IRA, Ellis stated that "If an allegation was made against a volunteer it would have to be investigated [internally]...To be honest they were not qualified to deal with something like sexual abuse". Based on this, Philip Ryan of the Irish Independent accused Ellis of admitting that the IRA ran "kangaroo courts".

In 2015, Ellis refused to comment on if Sinn Féin leader Gerry Adams should distance himself from Thomas 'Slab' Murphy, an Irish republican found guilty of tax fraud and an allegedly a former IRA Chief of Staff.

At the 2016 general election Ellis was again elected with 7,571 (20.5%) of the first preference votes.

In September 2016, a bill was put forward, which if passed would have criminalised hare coursing. Sinn Féin supports the legalisation of hare coursing and decided to apply the party whip. As Ellis opposes it he declined to vote. He defied party instructions by not informing party whip Aengus O'Snodaigh that he would not be taking part in the vote so he could be excused. He was subsequently given a written warning.

In December 2016, during a session of the Dáil, Ellis and his fellow Sinn Féin TD Martin Ferris were accused by Fine Gael TD Alan Farrell of having information in relation to the Shooting of Brian Stack, the chief prison officer at Portlaoise Prison, in 1983. Sinn Féin leader Gerry Adams had just delivered an address to the Dáil in relation to Stack when Farrell rose and used Dáil privilege to state Gerry Adams had listed Ellis and Ferris as amongst people who may have information about the Stack death in an e-mail to the Garda Commission in February 2014, and asked that the two should also address the Dáil on the matter. Ellis immediately responded by stating "I refute [sic] any allegations. For the information, the man in question claims to be a solicitor, I was actually in jail for the period. In Portlaoise, and before that in America, so you should check your facts. You're a disgrace". Ferris followed Ellis, and stated "On the record of this house; In 2013 I met with gardaí at their request regarding the death of Brian Stack, I co-operated fully with them and I have nothing to answer for, and it's a disgrace what you have come in here naming. You should be ashamed of yourself". In December 2016 Ellis stated he had received death threats following the exchange in the Dáil.

In February 2018 Ellis was censured by Sinn Féin after he stated publicly that fellow party member and councillor for Ballymun Noeleen Reilly was "not fit to represent Sinn Féin" and that she had waged a social media campaign against him. For her part, Reilly was suspended by the party for six months.

At the 2020 general election Ellis was again elected with 14,375 first preference votes (44.4%). He was a poll topper in the 2020 general election along with many Sinn Féin TDs in the 2020 election. He was criticised for joining his supporters singing Come Out, Ye Black and Tans at the count, but he dismissed the suggestion it was inappropriate.

At the 2024 general election, Ellis was re-elected to the Dáil.

=== Political views ===
Ellis is in favour of the abolition of the local property tax. Ellis supported the repealing of the 8th Amendment, which forbade abortion in the Republic of Ireland. Ellis believes refugees should have the right to work in Ireland and believes the system of direct provision should come to an end.

== 2012 allegation of connection to "50 murders" ==
In 2012 the Irish Independent, citing released internal documents held by the British government that were previously sealed for 30 years, alleged that by 1982 British authorities believed Ellis to be linked to "50 murders" as part of his time in the Provisional IRA. The allegation specifically cited a telegraph from the British embassy in Washington to American counterparts in which they claimed that Ellis was linked by "forensic evidence to some 50 murders” across Northern Ireland and the Republic of Ireland. The Independent claimed another document stated that Ellis was a "leading member" of the Provisional IRA.

Sinn Féin denounced the allegations as an "Indo Smear" and released a statement declaring "This is not the first time such unsubstantiated allegations have been made and Dessie Ellis rejects them as he has repeatedly done. Following a prolonged hunger strike in the 1990s to protest his extradition to Britain, Dessie successfully beat these trumped-up charges in court. Dessie Ellis has made no secret of his involvement in the republican struggle over many decades, including within the ranks of the IRA. Dessie has also been an important persuader for the Peace Process for many years." Ellis did not make any personal statement on the allegations and referred journalists to Sinn Féin's official statement.

== Personal life ==
Ellis is proficient in karate, holding a black belt, and teaches martial arts to young people. He is married to Anne Ellis (née Dunne) with grown up children.

Dáil	Election	Deputy (Party)	Deputy (Party)	Deputy (Party)	Deputy (Party)
2nd	1921	Philip Cosgrave (SF)	Joseph McGrath (SF)	Richard Mulcahy (SF)	Michael Staines (SF)
3rd	1922	Philip Cosgrave (PT-SF)	Joseph McGrath (PT-SF)	Richard Mulcahy (PT-SF)	Michael Staines (PT-SF)
4th	1923	Constituency abolished. See Dublin North			

Dáil	Election	Deputy (Party)	Deputy (Party)	Deputy (Party)	Deputy (Party)	Deputy (Party)
9th	1937	Seán T. O'Kelly (FF)	A. P. Byrne (Ind.)	Cormac Breathnach (FF)	Patrick McGilligan (FG)	Archie Heron (Lab)
10th	1938	Seán T. O'Kelly (FF)	A. P. Byrne (Ind.)	Cormac Breathnach (FF)	Patrick McGilligan (FG)	Eamonn Cooney (FF)
11th	1943	Seán T. O'Kelly (FF)	A. P. Byrne (Ind.)	Cormac Breathnach (FF)	Patrick McGilligan (FG)	Martin O'Sullivan (Lab)
12th	1944	Seán T. O'Kelly (FF)	John S. O'Connor (FF)	Cormac Breathnach (FF)	Patrick McGilligan (FG)	Martin O'Sullivan (Lab)
12th	1945 by-election	Vivion de Valera (FF)	John S. O'Connor (FF)	Cormac Breathnach (FF)	Patrick McGilligan (FG)	Martin O'Sullivan (Lab)
13th	1948	Mick Fitzpatrick (CnaP)	A. P. Byrne (Ind.)	Cormac Breathnach (FF)	3 seats from 1948 to 1969	
14th	1951	Declan Costello (FG)	A. P. Byrne (Ind.)	Cormac Breathnach (FF)	3 seats from 1948 to 1969	
14th	1952 by-election	Declan Costello (FG)	Thomas Byrne (Ind.)	Cormac Breathnach (FF)	3 seats from 1948 to 1969	
15th	1954	Declan Costello (FG)	Thomas Byrne (Ind.)	Richard Gogan (FF)	3 seats from 1948 to 1969	
16th	1957	Declan Costello (FG)	Thomas Byrne (Ind.)	Richard Gogan (FF)	3 seats from 1948 to 1969	
17th	1961	Declan Costello (FG)	Michael Mullen (Lab)	Richard Gogan (FF)	3 seats from 1948 to 1969	
18th	1965	Declan Costello (FG)	Michael Mullen (Lab)	Richard Gogan (FF)	3 seats from 1948 to 1969	
19th	1969	Hugh Byrne (FG)	Jim Tunney (FF)	Richard Gogan (FF)	David Thornley (Lab)	4 seats from 1969 to 1977
20th	1973	Hugh Byrne (FG)	Jim Tunney (FF)	Richard Gogan (FF)	David Thornley (Lab)	4 seats from 1969 to 1977
21st	1977	Constituency abolished. See Dublin Finglas and Dublin Cabra				

Dáil	Election	Deputy (Party)	Deputy (Party)	Deputy (Party)	Deputy (Party)
22nd	1981	Jim Tunney (FF)	Michael Barrett (FF)	Mary Flaherty (FG)	Hugh Byrne (FG)
23rd	1982 (Feb)	Jim Tunney (FF)	Michael Barrett (FF)	Mary Flaherty (FG)	Proinsias De Rossa (WP)
24th	1982 (Nov)	Jim Tunney (FF)	Michael Barrett (FF)	Mary Flaherty (FG)	Proinsias De Rossa (WP)
25th	1987	Jim Tunney (FF)	Michael Barrett (FF)	Mary Flaherty (FG)	Proinsias De Rossa (WP)
26th	1989	Jim Tunney (FF)	Michael Barrett (FF)	Mary Flaherty (FG)	Proinsias De Rossa (WP)
27th	1992	Noel Ahern (FF)	Róisín Shortall (Lab)	Mary Flaherty (FG)	Proinsias De Rossa (DL)
28th	1997	Noel Ahern (FF)	Róisín Shortall (Lab)	Pat Carey (FF)	Proinsias De Rossa (DL)
29th	2002	Noel Ahern (FF)	Róisín Shortall (Lab)	Pat Carey (FF)	3 seats from 2002
30th	2007	Noel Ahern (FF)	Róisín Shortall (Lab)	Pat Carey (FF)	3 seats from 2002
31st	2011	Dessie Ellis (SF)	Róisín Shortall (Lab)	John Lyons (Lab)	3 seats from 2002
32nd	2016	Dessie Ellis (SF)	Róisín Shortall (SD)	Noel Rock (FG)	3 seats from 2002
33rd	2020	Dessie Ellis (SF)	Róisín Shortall (SD)	Paul McAuliffe (FF)	3 seats from 2002
34th	2024	Dessie Ellis (SF)	Rory Hearne (SD)	Paul McAuliffe (FF)	3 seats from 2002
