= Richard Gogan =

Irish politician (1899–1982)

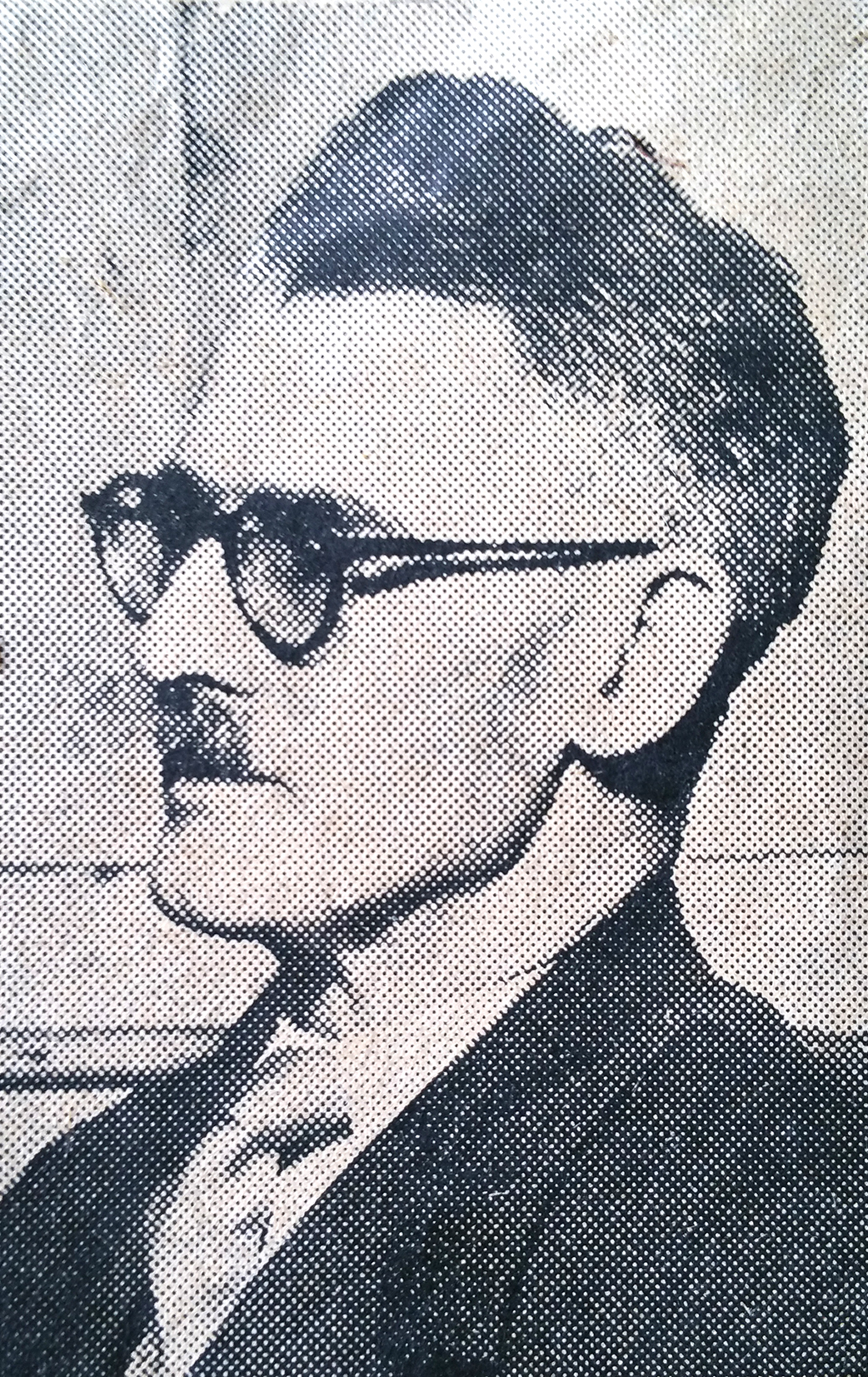
- Gogan, c. 1960

Teachta Dála
- In office May 1954 – June 1977
- Constituency: Dublin North-West

Personal details
- Born: 29 November 1899 Dublin, Ireland
- Died: 28 April 1982 (aged 82)
- Party: Fianna Fáil
- Awards: 1916 Medal; Service Medal (1917–1921)

Military service
- Allegiance: Irish Republic
- Service: Irish Volunteers; Irish Republican Army; Anti-Treaty IRA
- Years of service: 1913–1923
- Rank: Volunteer (Irish Volunteers); Private (Irish Republican Army)
- Unit: B Company, 1st Battalion, Dublin Brigade
- Conflicts: Easter Rising; Irish War of Independence; Irish Civil War

Richard P. Gogan (29 November 1899 – 28 April 1982) was a member of the Irish Volunteers who fought in the 1916 Easter Rising. In later life, he became a Fianna Fáil politician.

== Early and personal life ==
He was the son of William J. Gogan and was married to Kitty Gogan. He was one of the Guard of Honour at the funeral of Jeremiah O'Donovan Rossa in August 1915, and was present when Patrick Pearse gave his famous speech at the graveside.

== Revolutionary period (1916–1923) ==
Gogan joined the Irish Volunteers in November 1913. He was a member of B Company, 1st Battalion, Dublin Brigade from 1914 commanded by Edward Daly. Prior to the Rising, Gogan worked in a bomb factory at a house called 'Cluny' in Clontarf which was used as an Irish Volunteers' munitions base. During the 1916 Easter Rising, he saw action at Cabra and at the G.P.O. On Easter Monday, 24 April 1916, he was part of a unit that were tasked to take control of three bridges into Dublin, at the North Circular Road, Cabra Road and Cross Guns Bridge on Phibsboro Road. They came under machine gun and artillery fire from nearby British military units, and an artillery piece sprayed their barricade with shrapnel after which they escaped and took shelter near Ben Eavin House in Glasnevin. At some point in the early hours of 25 April 1916, he left along with Jack Price, PJ Corless and his brother Vincent. Early in the morning of Friday 28 April, he volunteered as a stretcher-bearer to carry the wounded James Connolly out of the GPO, which was by then on fire. Under heavy machine-gun fire, he and two others (Sean Price and Paddy Ryan) carried Connolly to an Irish Volunteer position in a mineral water factory on Henry Place.

During the Irish War of Independence, Gogan took part in arms raids, armed street patrols, dispatch work and had custody of an arms dump at his father's business premises at 184 Parnell Street, Dublin. Taking the anti Treaty side in the Civil War, he took part in the occupation and defence of buildings during the Battle of Dublin. He was captured in late January 1923 by National forces and interned in Mountjoy Gaol, Dublin. He signed the 'form' pledging not to take up arms against the Free State for early release. Gogan reported back for duty but had no further activity. His father's business premises at 184 Parnell Street, Dublin was raided by the Garda Síochána as late as 1927. Gogan was later awarded a pension by the Irish government under the Military Service Pensions Act, 1934 for his service with the Irish Volunteers and the IRA between 1916 and 1923.

== Political career ==
He was a founding member of Fianna Fáil. Gogan was first elected to Dáil Éireann as a Fianna Fáil Teachta Dála (TD) for the Dublin North-West constituency at the 1954 general election, having previously unsuccessfully contested the 1948 and 1951 general elections. He held his seat at every subsequent election until losing at the 1977 general election in the new Dublin Cabra constituency.

Dáil	Election	Deputy (Party)	Deputy (Party)	Deputy (Party)	Deputy (Party)
2nd	1921	Philip Cosgrave (SF)	Joseph McGrath (SF)	Richard Mulcahy (SF)	Michael Staines (SF)
3rd	1922	Philip Cosgrave (PT-SF)	Joseph McGrath (PT-SF)	Richard Mulcahy (PT-SF)	Michael Staines (PT-SF)
4th	1923	Constituency abolished. See Dublin North			

Dáil	Election	Deputy (Party)	Deputy (Party)	Deputy (Party)	Deputy (Party)	Deputy (Party)
9th	1937	Seán T. O'Kelly (FF)	A. P. Byrne (Ind.)	Cormac Breathnach (FF)	Patrick McGilligan (FG)	Archie Heron (Lab)
10th	1938	Seán T. O'Kelly (FF)	A. P. Byrne (Ind.)	Cormac Breathnach (FF)	Patrick McGilligan (FG)	Eamonn Cooney (FF)
11th	1943	Seán T. O'Kelly (FF)	A. P. Byrne (Ind.)	Cormac Breathnach (FF)	Patrick McGilligan (FG)	Martin O'Sullivan (Lab)
12th	1944	Seán T. O'Kelly (FF)	John S. O'Connor (FF)	Cormac Breathnach (FF)	Patrick McGilligan (FG)	Martin O'Sullivan (Lab)
12th	1945 by-election	Vivion de Valera (FF)	John S. O'Connor (FF)	Cormac Breathnach (FF)	Patrick McGilligan (FG)	Martin O'Sullivan (Lab)
13th	1948	Mick Fitzpatrick (CnaP)	A. P. Byrne (Ind.)	Cormac Breathnach (FF)	3 seats from 1948 to 1969	
14th	1951	Declan Costello (FG)	A. P. Byrne (Ind.)	Cormac Breathnach (FF)	3 seats from 1948 to 1969	
14th	1952 by-election	Declan Costello (FG)	Thomas Byrne (Ind.)	Cormac Breathnach (FF)	3 seats from 1948 to 1969	
15th	1954	Declan Costello (FG)	Thomas Byrne (Ind.)	Richard Gogan (FF)	3 seats from 1948 to 1969	
16th	1957	Declan Costello (FG)	Thomas Byrne (Ind.)	Richard Gogan (FF)	3 seats from 1948 to 1969	
17th	1961	Declan Costello (FG)	Michael Mullen (Lab)	Richard Gogan (FF)	3 seats from 1948 to 1969	
18th	1965	Declan Costello (FG)	Michael Mullen (Lab)	Richard Gogan (FF)	3 seats from 1948 to 1969	
19th	1969	Hugh Byrne (FG)	Jim Tunney (FF)	Richard Gogan (FF)	David Thornley (Lab)	4 seats from 1969 to 1977
20th	1973	Hugh Byrne (FG)	Jim Tunney (FF)	Richard Gogan (FF)	David Thornley (Lab)	4 seats from 1969 to 1977
21st	1977	Constituency abolished. See Dublin Finglas and Dublin Cabra				

Dáil	Election	Deputy (Party)	Deputy (Party)	Deputy (Party)	Deputy (Party)
22nd	1981	Jim Tunney (FF)	Michael Barrett (FF)	Mary Flaherty (FG)	Hugh Byrne (FG)
23rd	1982 (Feb)	Jim Tunney (FF)	Michael Barrett (FF)	Mary Flaherty (FG)	Proinsias De Rossa (WP)
24th	1982 (Nov)	Jim Tunney (FF)	Michael Barrett (FF)	Mary Flaherty (FG)	Proinsias De Rossa (WP)
25th	1987	Jim Tunney (FF)	Michael Barrett (FF)	Mary Flaherty (FG)	Proinsias De Rossa (WP)
26th	1989	Jim Tunney (FF)	Michael Barrett (FF)	Mary Flaherty (FG)	Proinsias De Rossa (WP)
27th	1992	Noel Ahern (FF)	Róisín Shortall (Lab)	Mary Flaherty (FG)	Proinsias De Rossa (DL)
28th	1997	Noel Ahern (FF)	Róisín Shortall (Lab)	Pat Carey (FF)	Proinsias De Rossa (DL)
29th	2002	Noel Ahern (FF)	Róisín Shortall (Lab)	Pat Carey (FF)	3 seats from 2002
30th	2007	Noel Ahern (FF)	Róisín Shortall (Lab)	Pat Carey (FF)	3 seats from 2002
31st	2011	Dessie Ellis (SF)	Róisín Shortall (Lab)	John Lyons (Lab)	3 seats from 2002
32nd	2016	Dessie Ellis (SF)	Róisín Shortall (SD)	Noel Rock (FG)	3 seats from 2002
33rd	2020	Dessie Ellis (SF)	Róisín Shortall (SD)	Paul McAuliffe (FF)	3 seats from 2002
34th	2024	Dessie Ellis (SF)	Rory Hearne (SD)	Paul McAuliffe (FF)	3 seats from 2002
