= David Thornley =

Irish politician (1935–1978)

Teachta Dála
- In office June 1969 – June 1977
- Constituency: Dublin North-West

Personal details
- Born: 31 July 1935 Surrey, England
- Died: 18 June 1978 (aged 42) Dublin, Ireland
- Party: Labour Party
- Spouse: Petria Hughes (m. 1958)
- Children: 2
- Education: Trinity College Dublin

David Andrew Thornley (31 July 1935 – 18 June 1978) was an Irish Labour Party politician and university professor at Trinity College Dublin.

== Life ==
Born in Surrey, England, the youngest child of Welshman Frederick Edward Thornley and Dublin-born Maud Helen Thornley (née Browne). His parents, both civil servants, met while working in Inland Revenue in Dublin in the 1910s.

He received a BA and PhD at Trinity College Dublin. His PhD was entitled "Isaac Butt and the creation of an Irish parliamentary party (1868–1879)" and was written under the supervision of Theodore William Moody. He was appointed Associate professor of Trinity in 1968. by then he had been working as a presenter on 7 Days since 1963. In 1964 he published the book Isaac Butt and Home Rule.

After joining Labour in 1969 he was elected to Dáil Éireann as a Labour Party Teachta Dála (TD) for the Dublin North-West constituency at the 1969 general election. He confronted the party leader Brendan Corish, who at the time of the Arms Crisis reportedly rejected out of hand any suggestion of military aid or use of force after the outbreak of violence in Northern Ireland.

Thornley considered himself to be "in the mould of James Connolly", being a practising catholic, Marxist and republican.

In December 1972 he called for the immediate release of Seán Mac Stíofáin, then leader of the Provisional IRA. He was re-elected at the 1973 general election. In April 1976, he lost the Labour party whip after appearing on Sinn Féin platform during Easter Rising commemorations. In September 1976, he voted for the Criminal Justice (Jurisdiction) Bill despite misgivings. He told The Irish Times: "When I get very depressed I drink too much. When I voted for the Criminal Justice (Jurisdiction Bill) I went on the batter for a forthnight [sic]." In February 1977, he was re-admitted to the Labour Parliamentary party. He lost his seat at the 1977 general election.

In 1978 he joined the newly formed Socialist Labour Party stating that he had done so because: "There is no man in politics that I respect more than Noël Browne, despite our occasional differences. If the SLP is good for him, it's good enough for me".

== Death and legacy ==
On 12 June 1978 Thornley was admitted, with an illness of the liver and kidney, to Jervis Street Hospital. He died on 18 June 1978 in County Dublin, aged 42, of kidney disease. He is buried in Bohernabreen Cemetery in Dublin. The Trinity College Labour Branch was formerly named the David Thornley Branch in his honour.

== Bibliography ==
- Thornley, Edward. Lone Crusader: David Thornley and the Intellectuals.

Dáil	Election	Deputy (Party)	Deputy (Party)	Deputy (Party)	Deputy (Party)
2nd	1921	Philip Cosgrave (SF)	Joseph McGrath (SF)	Richard Mulcahy (SF)	Michael Staines (SF)
3rd	1922	Philip Cosgrave (PT-SF)	Joseph McGrath (PT-SF)	Richard Mulcahy (PT-SF)	Michael Staines (PT-SF)
4th	1923	Constituency abolished. See Dublin North			

Dáil	Election	Deputy (Party)	Deputy (Party)	Deputy (Party)	Deputy (Party)	Deputy (Party)
9th	1937	Seán T. O'Kelly (FF)	A. P. Byrne (Ind.)	Cormac Breathnach (FF)	Patrick McGilligan (FG)	Archie Heron (Lab)
10th	1938	Seán T. O'Kelly (FF)	A. P. Byrne (Ind.)	Cormac Breathnach (FF)	Patrick McGilligan (FG)	Eamonn Cooney (FF)
11th	1943	Seán T. O'Kelly (FF)	A. P. Byrne (Ind.)	Cormac Breathnach (FF)	Patrick McGilligan (FG)	Martin O'Sullivan (Lab)
12th	1944	Seán T. O'Kelly (FF)	John S. O'Connor (FF)	Cormac Breathnach (FF)	Patrick McGilligan (FG)	Martin O'Sullivan (Lab)
12th	1945 by-election	Vivion de Valera (FF)	John S. O'Connor (FF)	Cormac Breathnach (FF)	Patrick McGilligan (FG)	Martin O'Sullivan (Lab)
13th	1948	Mick Fitzpatrick (CnaP)	A. P. Byrne (Ind.)	Cormac Breathnach (FF)	3 seats from 1948 to 1969	
14th	1951	Declan Costello (FG)	A. P. Byrne (Ind.)	Cormac Breathnach (FF)	3 seats from 1948 to 1969	
14th	1952 by-election	Declan Costello (FG)	Thomas Byrne (Ind.)	Cormac Breathnach (FF)	3 seats from 1948 to 1969	
15th	1954	Declan Costello (FG)	Thomas Byrne (Ind.)	Richard Gogan (FF)	3 seats from 1948 to 1969	
16th	1957	Declan Costello (FG)	Thomas Byrne (Ind.)	Richard Gogan (FF)	3 seats from 1948 to 1969	
17th	1961	Declan Costello (FG)	Michael Mullen (Lab)	Richard Gogan (FF)	3 seats from 1948 to 1969	
18th	1965	Declan Costello (FG)	Michael Mullen (Lab)	Richard Gogan (FF)	3 seats from 1948 to 1969	
19th	1969	Hugh Byrne (FG)	Jim Tunney (FF)	Richard Gogan (FF)	David Thornley (Lab)	4 seats from 1969 to 1977
20th	1973	Hugh Byrne (FG)	Jim Tunney (FF)	Richard Gogan (FF)	David Thornley (Lab)	4 seats from 1969 to 1977
21st	1977	Constituency abolished. See Dublin Finglas and Dublin Cabra				

Dáil	Election	Deputy (Party)	Deputy (Party)	Deputy (Party)	Deputy (Party)
22nd	1981	Jim Tunney (FF)	Michael Barrett (FF)	Mary Flaherty (FG)	Hugh Byrne (FG)
23rd	1982 (Feb)	Jim Tunney (FF)	Michael Barrett (FF)	Mary Flaherty (FG)	Proinsias De Rossa (WP)
24th	1982 (Nov)	Jim Tunney (FF)	Michael Barrett (FF)	Mary Flaherty (FG)	Proinsias De Rossa (WP)
25th	1987	Jim Tunney (FF)	Michael Barrett (FF)	Mary Flaherty (FG)	Proinsias De Rossa (WP)
26th	1989	Jim Tunney (FF)	Michael Barrett (FF)	Mary Flaherty (FG)	Proinsias De Rossa (WP)
27th	1992	Noel Ahern (FF)	Róisín Shortall (Lab)	Mary Flaherty (FG)	Proinsias De Rossa (DL)
28th	1997	Noel Ahern (FF)	Róisín Shortall (Lab)	Pat Carey (FF)	Proinsias De Rossa (DL)
29th	2002	Noel Ahern (FF)	Róisín Shortall (Lab)	Pat Carey (FF)	3 seats from 2002
30th	2007	Noel Ahern (FF)	Róisín Shortall (Lab)	Pat Carey (FF)	3 seats from 2002
31st	2011	Dessie Ellis (SF)	Róisín Shortall (Lab)	John Lyons (Lab)	3 seats from 2002
32nd	2016	Dessie Ellis (SF)	Róisín Shortall (SD)	Noel Rock (FG)	3 seats from 2002
33rd	2020	Dessie Ellis (SF)	Róisín Shortall (SD)	Paul McAuliffe (FF)	3 seats from 2002
34th	2024	Dessie Ellis (SF)	Rory Hearne (SD)	Paul McAuliffe (FF)	3 seats from 2002
