= Michael Mullen (Irish politician) =

Irish politician (1919–1982)

Senator
- In office 1 June 1973 – 27 October 1977
- Constituency: Nominated by the Taoiseach

Teachta Dála
- In office October 1961 – June 1969
- Constituency: Dublin North-West

Personal details
- Born: 1 February 1919 Dublin, Ireland
- Died: 1 November 1982 (aged 63) Frankfurt, Germany
- Party: Labour Party
- Spouse: Anne Peavoy
- Children: 5

Michael Mullen (1 February 1919 – 1 November 1982) was an Irish Labour Party politician and trade union official.

He was born 1 February 1919 in Church Street, Dublin, the son of John Mullen, a glassblower, and Martha Smith. He was educated at St Michan's school in Halston St., but left school at 14 to work in a butcher's after his father's death. At 16 he got a job in the Ever Ready battery factory in Portobello, where he joined the Irish Transport and General Workers' Union (ITGWU), and was elected a shop steward the following year. He was a member of the Irish Republican Army during the 1940s, but left in 1945 to join the Labour Party.

He was an unsuccessful candidate at the 1951 and 1957 general elections. He was elected to Dáil Éireann as a Labour Party Teachta Dála (TD) for the Dublin North-West constituency at the 1961 general election and was re-elected at the 1965 general election. He did not contest the 1969 general election. He was nominated by the Taoiseach Liam Cosgrave in 1973 to the 13th Seanad.

He was a member of Dublin Corporation from 1960 to 1969. He was general secretary of the ITGWU from 1969 to 1982.

He was married to Anne Peavoy, and they had three daughters and two sons. He died on 1 November 1982 in Frankfurt, while attending a trade union conference.

Trade union offices
| Preceded by Fintan Kennedy | General Secretary of the Irish Transport and General Workers' Union; 1969–1982 | Succeeded by Christy Kirwan |

| Dáil | Election | Deputy (Party) | Deputy (Party) | Deputy (Party) | Deputy (Party) |
|---|---|---|---|---|---|
| 2nd | 1921 | Philip Cosgrave (SF) | Joseph McGrath (SF) | Richard Mulcahy (SF) | Michael Staines (SF) |
| 3rd | 1922 | Philip Cosgrave (PT-SF) | Joseph McGrath (PT-SF) | Richard Mulcahy (PT-SF) | Michael Staines (PT-SF) |
| 4th | 1923 | Constituency abolished. See Dublin North | | | |

| Dáil | Election | Deputy (Party) | Deputy (Party) | Deputy (Party) | Deputy (Party) | Deputy (Party) |
|---|---|---|---|---|---|---|
| 9th | 1937 | Seán T. O'Kelly (FF) | A. P. Byrne (Ind.) | Cormac Breathnach (FF) | Patrick McGilligan (FG) | Archie Heron (Lab) |
| 10th | 1938 | Seán T. O'Kelly (FF) | A. P. Byrne (Ind.) | Cormac Breathnach (FF) | Patrick McGilligan (FG) | Eamonn Cooney (FF) |
| 11th | 1943 | Seán T. O'Kelly (FF) | A. P. Byrne (Ind.) | Cormac Breathnach (FF) | Patrick McGilligan (FG) | Martin O'Sullivan (Lab) |
| 12th | 1944 | Seán T. O'Kelly (FF) | John S. O'Connor (FF) | Cormac Breathnach (FF) | Patrick McGilligan (FG) | Martin O'Sullivan (Lab) |
| 12th | 1945 by-election | Vivion de Valera (FF) | John S. O'Connor (FF) | Cormac Breathnach (FF) | Patrick McGilligan (FG) | Martin O'Sullivan (Lab) |
| 13th | 1948 | Mick Fitzpatrick (CnaP) | A. P. Byrne (Ind.) | Cormac Breathnach (FF) | 3 seats from 1948 to 1969 | |
| 14th | 1951 | Declan Costello (FG) | A. P. Byrne (Ind.) | Cormac Breathnach (FF) | 3 seats from 1948 to 1969 | |
| 14th | 1952 by-election | Declan Costello (FG) | Thomas Byrne (Ind.) | Cormac Breathnach (FF) | 3 seats from 1948 to 1969 | |
| 15th | 1954 | Declan Costello (FG) | Thomas Byrne (Ind.) | Richard Gogan (FF) | 3 seats from 1948 to 1969 | |
| 16th | 1957 | Declan Costello (FG) | Thomas Byrne (Ind.) | Richard Gogan (FF) | 3 seats from 1948 to 1969 | |
| 17th | 1961 | Declan Costello (FG) | Michael Mullen (Lab) | Richard Gogan (FF) | 3 seats from 1948 to 1969 | |
| 18th | 1965 | Declan Costello (FG) | Michael Mullen (Lab) | Richard Gogan (FF) | 3 seats from 1948 to 1969 | |
| 19th | 1969 | Hugh Byrne (FG) | Jim Tunney (FF) | Richard Gogan (FF) | David Thornley (Lab) | 4 seats from 1969 to 1977 |
| 20th | 1973 | Hugh Byrne (FG) | Jim Tunney (FF) | Richard Gogan (FF) | David Thornley (Lab) | 4 seats from 1969 to 1977 |
| 21st | 1977 | Constituency abolished. See Dublin Finglas and Dublin Cabra | | | | |

| Dáil | Election | Deputy (Party) | Deputy (Party) | Deputy (Party) | Deputy (Party) |
|---|---|---|---|---|---|
| 22nd | 1981 | Jim Tunney (FF) | Michael Barrett (FF) | Mary Flaherty (FG) | Hugh Byrne (FG) |
| 23rd | 1982 (Feb) | Jim Tunney (FF) | Michael Barrett (FF) | Mary Flaherty (FG) | Proinsias De Rossa (WP) |
| 24th | 1982 (Nov) | Jim Tunney (FF) | Michael Barrett (FF) | Mary Flaherty (FG) | Proinsias De Rossa (WP) |
| 25th | 1987 | Jim Tunney (FF) | Michael Barrett (FF) | Mary Flaherty (FG) | Proinsias De Rossa (WP) |
| 26th | 1989 | Jim Tunney (FF) | Michael Barrett (FF) | Mary Flaherty (FG) | Proinsias De Rossa (WP) |
| 27th | 1992 | Noel Ahern (FF) | Róisín Shortall (Lab) | Mary Flaherty (FG) | Proinsias De Rossa (DL) |
| 28th | 1997 | Noel Ahern (FF) | Róisín Shortall (Lab) | Pat Carey (FF) | Proinsias De Rossa (DL) |
| 29th | 2002 | Noel Ahern (FF) | Róisín Shortall (Lab) | Pat Carey (FF) | 3 seats from 2002 |
| 30th | 2007 | Noel Ahern (FF) | Róisín Shortall (Lab) | Pat Carey (FF) | 3 seats from 2002 |
| 31st | 2011 | Dessie Ellis (SF) | Róisín Shortall (Lab) | John Lyons (Lab) | 3 seats from 2002 |
| 32nd | 2016 | Dessie Ellis (SF) | Róisín Shortall (SD) | Noel Rock (FG) | 3 seats from 2002 |
| 33rd | 2020 | Dessie Ellis (SF) | Róisín Shortall (SD) | Paul McAuliffe (FF) | 3 seats from 2002 |
| 34th | 2024 | Dessie Ellis (SF) | Rory Hearne (SD) | Paul McAuliffe (FF) | 3 seats from 2002 |
