= Noel Hartnett =

Irish politician and barrister (1909–1960)

Senator
- In office 14 August 1951 – 22 July 1954
- Constituency: Labour Panel

Personal details
- Born: 21 December 1909 County Kerry, Ireland
- Died: 4 October 1960 (aged 50) Dublin, Ireland
- Party: Clann na Poblachta
- Other political affiliations: National Progressive Democrats; Fianna Fáil
- Children: 3
- Education: Trinity College Dublin; King's Inns

Maurice Noel Hartnett (21 December 1909 – 4 October 1960) was an Irish politician, barrister, broadcaster and writer. He was a member of Seanad Éireann from 1951 to 1954.

Hartnett was born 21 December 1909 in Kenmare, County Kerry, a son of William Hartnett, a pharmacist and member of the Irish Republican Brotherhood, and Kathleen Hartnett (née Barbery). During the Irish Civil War the Hartnett home and family business were burnt down and they moved to Dublin. He was educated at St Brendan's College, Killarney and Trinity College Dublin (TCD).

He worked as a schoolteacher before becoming press officer to the Irish Tourist Association. In the 1930s he joined Radio Éireann, the Irish broadcasting company, as producer, commentator, scriptwriter and announcer. He joined Fianna Fáil while in TCD, and became a party election organiser. He also represented the Dublin University constituency on the Fianna Fáil national executive.

He studied at King's Inns and was called to the bar in 1937. Until the 1940s, Hartnett was Junior counsel to former IRA Chief of Staff Seán MacBride in a number of defences of IRA prisoners. In 1946, the pair represented the deceased hunger-striker Seán McCaughey at an inquest into his death, which embarrassed the government of Éamon de Valera by exposing the poor conditions at Portlaoise Prison. Hartnett - whose family were all supporters of de Valera and Fianna Fáil - was then dismissed from his position at Radio Éireann under the influence of de Valera. Hartnett left Fianna Faíl soon after and joined Clann na Poblachta, the new political party founded by MacBride.

In 1947, MacBride became a Teachta Dála (TD) for Dublin County in the 1947 by-election. De Valera then sought to outwit his opponents with a snap election in 1948. Because of his political experience, MacBride chose Hartnett as his director of elections. He narrated and appeared in Ireland's first political campaigning film, for Clann na Poblachta, called "Our Country". After the new party won ten seats, it formed part of the first Inter-Party Government, ousting Fianna Fáil from their long tenure as the party of government. Hartnett had failed to win the seat in Dún Laoghaire and Rathdown, though there remained the possibility of appointment to the Seanad Éireann. However, he was bitterly hurt to be overlooked by Seán MacBride to be party spokesman in the Seanad. After a bill to fund a new Irish News Agency (with an anti-partition slant) was passed in 1949, MacBride's initial choice for head of the Agency was Hartnett but after a row with him he asked Conor Cruise O'Brien instead, a man who referred to Hartnett as "a dedicated republican propagandist." Hartnett ended up on the board of the Agency. MacBride also took Hartnett with him as a speech-writer on a trip to the US, to pen the rousing, sentimental, republican message for the local audience; Hartnett was sent home half-way through, initially explaining that MacBride considered the words of his speech too aggressive. Eventually, because of MacBride's failure to act regarding a case of political cronyism concerning James Everett, Minister for Posts and Telegraphs in the Baltinglass affair, he provided a resignation letter for MacBride in February 1951.

In February 1951 Hartnett resigned from Clann na Poblachta. In the subsequent election of 1951 he was Noël Browne's director of elections - with Browne running as an independent - and he threatened legal action against some clerics of the Catholic Church who had cast Browne, in his support of free healthcare, either as communist or Nazi.

It was arranged that same year for Hartnett to see a consultant cardiologist because of his ill health, and he was given a poor prognosis. Notwithstanding this, he continued in politics and was elected by the Labour Panel to the 7th Seanad, with Fianna Fáil support. He rejoined Fianna Fáil in October 1953, along with Noël Browne. He lost his seat at the 1954 Seanad election. In 1957 he resigned from Fianna Fáil with Browne, for whom he acted as election agent in the 1957 general election. In June 1958, he failed in his second attempt to become a TD, this time contesting representing a by-election in Dublin South-Central for the National Progressive Democrats.

He died from heart disease on 4 October 1960 at his home in Stillorgan, County Dublin. He was married, with two sons and a daughter.
