= Jack McQuillan =

Irish politician and trade unionist (1920–1998)

- McQuillan in 1948, taken outside Leinster House

Senator
- In office 23 June 1965 – 5 November 1969
- Constituency: Administrative Panel

Teachta Dála
- In office February 1948 – April 1965
- Constituency: Roscommon

Personal details
- Born: John McQuillan; 30 August 1920 Ballyforan, County Roscommon, Ireland
- Died: 8 March 1998 (aged 77) Bray, County Wicklow, Ireland
- Party: Clann na Poblachta (1945–1951); Independent (1951–1958); National Progressive Democrats (1958–1963); Labour Party (1963–1967); Socialist Labour Party (1977–1979)
- Spouse: Angela McQuillan
- Children: 1
- Education: Roscommon CBS; Summerhill College; St Clement's Redemptorist College

John McQuillan (30 August 1920 – 8 March 1998) was an Irish politician, trade unionist and army officer.

== Early life ==
He was born in Ballyforan, County Roscommon in 1920, the eldest of seven children. His father, Thomas Francis McQuillan was a Royal Irish Constabulary sergeant, and later became a school teacher, while his mother Anne (née Fallon) was a national school teacher who came from a Republican family. McQuillan was educated at Roscommon CBS, Summerhill College, Sligo, and St Clement's Redemptorist College, Limerick.

He was a member of the Roscommon county team that won the All-Ireland Senior Football Championship in 1943 and 1944. He began a career as an officer in the Irish Army though resigned to work as a local government official.

== Politics ==
He was elected to Dáil Éireann on his first attempt as a Clann na Poblachta Teachta Dála (TD) for the Roscommon constituency at the 1948 general election. After fellow Clann na Poblachta TD, Noël Browne resigned as Minister for Health, McQuillan resigned from Clann na Poblachta in support of Browne and sat as an Independent TD. He was re-elected at the 1951, 1954 and 1957 general elections as an independent TD.

On 16 May 1958, the National Progressive Democrats party was founded with Noël Browne and McQuillan as the party's leaders. Between 1958 and 1961, 7 of the 9 motions discussed in Private Member's Time had been proposed by one of them. In 1961 and 1962 they asked 1,400 parliamentary questions, 17% of the total. The Taoiseach Seán Lemass paid them a unique compliment by referring to them as "the real opposition". Both were re-elected at the 1961 general election. In October 1963 both men joined the Labour Party. This new arrangement did not prove electorally beneficial to McQuillan as he lost his seat in Roscommon at the 1965 general election. However, he was elected to Seanad Éireann by the Administrative Panel. He resigned the Labour Party whip in 1967 and did not seek re-election at the 1969 general election, and retired from his Roscommon County Council seat in 1974.

When the Socialist Labour Party was founded in 1977, McQuillan joined as a trustee of the new party but later resigned. Remaining close to Noël Browne he lobbied hard for him to get the Labour Party nomination to contest the 1990 presidential election for the Labour Party. However, Mary Robinson was the preferred candidate of Dick Spring.

He died on 8 March 1998 in Bray, County Wicklow.

== Sources ==
- Kevin Rafter (1996), The Clann: The Story of Clann na Poblachta
- John Horgan (2000), Noel Browne: Passionate Outsider
- Noel Browne (1986), Against the Tide (Gill & Macmillan)

Dáil	Election	Deputy (Party)	Deputy (Party)	Deputy (Party)	Deputy (Party)
4th	1923	George Noble Plunkett (Rep)	Henry Finlay (CnaG)	Gerald Boland (Rep)	Andrew Lavin (CnaG)
4th	1925 by-election	George Noble Plunkett (Rep)	Martin Conlon (CnaG)	Gerald Boland (Rep)	Andrew Lavin (CnaG)
5th	1927 (Jun)	Patrick O'Dowd (FF)	Martin Conlon (CnaG)	Gerald Boland (FF)	Michael Brennan (Ind.)
6th	1927 (Sep)	Patrick O'Dowd (FF)	Martin Conlon (CnaG)	Gerald Boland (FF)	Michael Brennan (Ind.)
7th	1932	Daniel O'Rourke (FF)	Martin Conlon (CnaG)	Gerald Boland (FF)	Frank MacDermot (NCP)
8th	1933	Patrick O'Dowd (FF)	Michael Brennan (CnaG)	Gerald Boland (FF)	Frank MacDermot (NCP)
9th	1937	Michael Brennan (FG)	Daniel O'Rourke (FF)	Gerald Boland (FF)	3 seats 1937–1948
10th	1938	Michael Brennan (FG)	Daniel O'Rourke (FF)	Gerald Boland (FF)	3 seats 1937–1948
11th	1943	John Meighan (CnaT)	John Beirne (CnaT)	Gerald Boland (FF)	3 seats 1937–1948
12th	1944	Daniel O'Rourke (FF)	John Beirne (CnaT)	Gerald Boland (FF)	3 seats 1937–1948
13th	1948	Daniel O'Rourke (FF)	John Beirne (CnaT)	Gerald Boland (FF)	Jack McQuillan (CnaP)
14th	1951	John Finan (CnaT)	John Beirne (CnaT)	Gerald Boland (FF)	Jack McQuillan (Ind.)
15th	1954	James Burke (FG)	John Beirne (CnaT)	Gerald Boland (FF)	Jack McQuillan (Ind.)
16th	1957	James Burke (FG)	John Beirne (CnaT)	Gerald Boland (FF)	Jack McQuillan (Ind.)
17th	1961	James Burke (FG)	Patrick J. Reynolds (FG)	Brian Lenihan Snr (FF)	Jack McQuillan (NPD)
17th	1964 by-election	Joan Burke (FG)	Patrick J. Reynolds (FG)	Brian Lenihan Snr (FF)	Jack McQuillan (NPD)
18th	1965	Joan Burke (FG)	Patrick J. Reynolds (FG)	Brian Lenihan Snr (FF)	Hugh Gibbons (FF)
19th	1969	Constituency abolished. See Roscommon–Leitrim			

Dáil	Election	Deputy (Party)	Deputy (Party)	Deputy (Party)
22nd	1981	Terry Leyden (FF)	Seán Doherty (FF)	John Connor (FG)
23rd	1982 (Feb)	Terry Leyden (FF)	Seán Doherty (FF)	Liam Naughten (FG)
24th	1982 (Nov)	Terry Leyden (FF)	Seán Doherty (FF)	Liam Naughten (FG)
25th	1987	Terry Leyden (FF)	Seán Doherty (FF)	Liam Naughten (FG)
26th	1989	Terry Leyden (FF)	Tom Foxe (Ind.)	John Connor (FG)
27th	1992	Constituency abolished. See Longford–Roscommon		
