= Mother and Child Scheme =

Former healthcare programme in Ireland

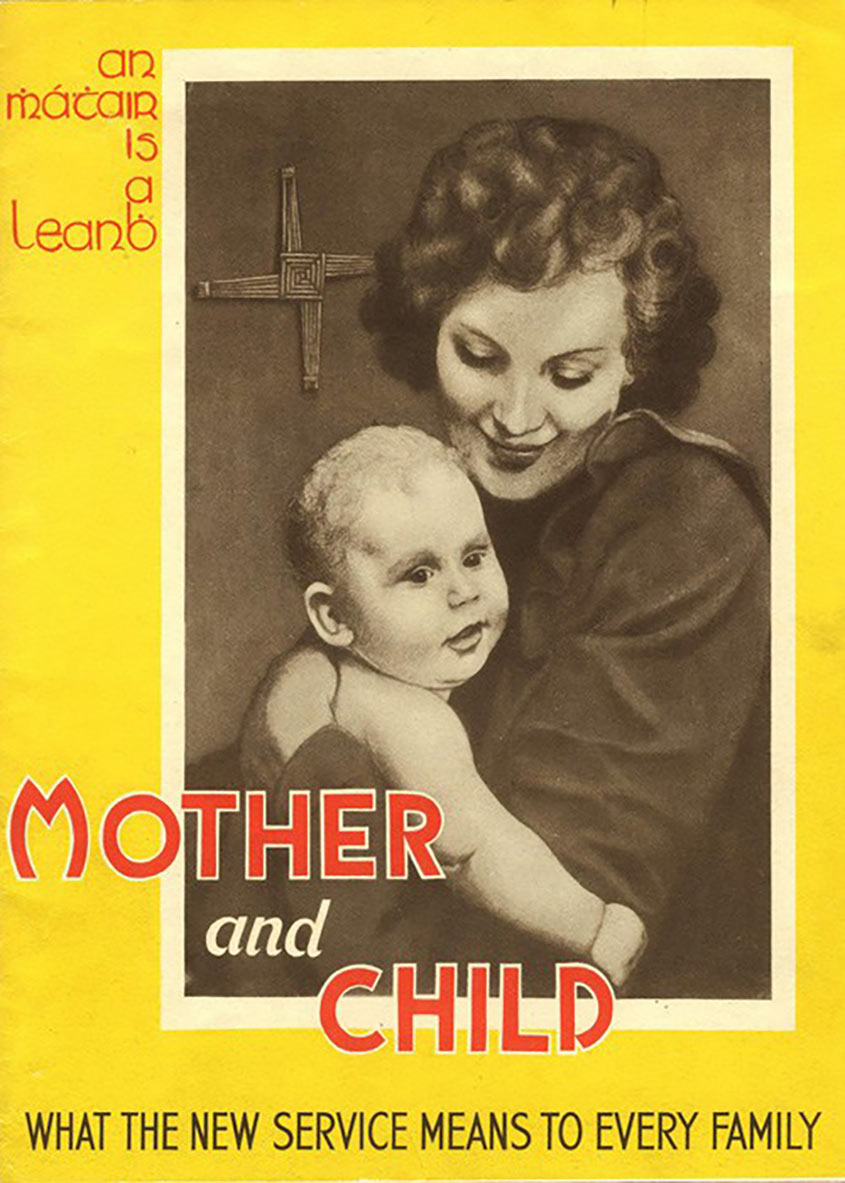
The cover of a booklet promoting the scheme, circa 1947

The Mother and Child Scheme was a healthcare programme in Ireland that would later become remembered as a major political crisis involving primarily the Irish Government and Roman Catholic Church in the early 1950s.

The scheme was referred to as the Mother and Child Service in legislation. A brochure, "What the new service means to every family", was prepared. It explained the new service but was not issued to the public. The scheme was engulfed in crisis before this could happen.

== Background ==
Since the establishment of the Irish Free State in 1922, responsibility in the government for healthcare had lain with the Minister for Local Government and Public Health. No significant reform of healthcare occurred in this period and the Catholic Church retained effective control through the ownership of hospitals and schools, while family doctors still largely practised in isolation of other medical professionals. The Irish State's laissez-faire attitude meant it provided for only 16 per cent of all health spending in the country, almost all of it directed at the poorest in society.

The Fianna Fáil TD Seán MacEntee started the process of reform as Minister for Local Government and Public Health in 1943. After the Second World War there was renewed optimism following the depression of the preceding decades. Once the Emergency was over, the political agenda began to shift from Irish Civil War politics, which had dominated for decades, towards domestic and social issues. Employment, health, and housing came to the fore, and this manifested itself in a move away from Fianna Fáil and Fine Gael.

The first formal attempt to introduce a Mother and Child scheme was made in December 1945 by the Fianna Fáil Minister for Health, Conn Ward, a medical doctor and pugnacious politician. Ward was forced out of office by a political scandal in 1946, and the legislative task passed to his successor, Dr James Ryan. International trends, including the establishment of the National Health Service in the United Kingdom and comparable developments elsewhere in Europe, were by this point being closely watched by the Irish political system. Problems such as high infant mortality rates led to increased support for health reform. Ryan was also acutely aware that the provision of free healthcare for all citizens in Northern Ireland, while most people in the Republic continued to pay privately, would be a considerable impediment to ending partition.

The office of Minister for Health was created as a separate "Minister of the Government" by the 1946 Ministers and Secretaries (Amendment) Act; this act also created the Minister for Social Welfare. The Fianna Fáil government published a much delayed White Paper in 1947. In October of that year, Ryan was notified of the objections of the Catholic hierarchy to his scheme. The bishops held that the proposals represented an unwarranted State interference in the individual's right to choose their own healthcare, though they made no objection to its most important provision, that it would be free and not means tested. This paper was followed by the 1947 Health Act, in which the scheme was provided for in Part III of the act. President O'Kelly convened a meeting of the Council of State to consider whether Part III should be referred to the Supreme Court, but he decided against doing so. Ryan's Bill was subsequently subject to a court challenge, and the 1948 general election resulted in the surprise fall of Fianna Fáil from government. The First Inter-Party Government was left with the responsibility of implementing the scheme.

== The scheme ==
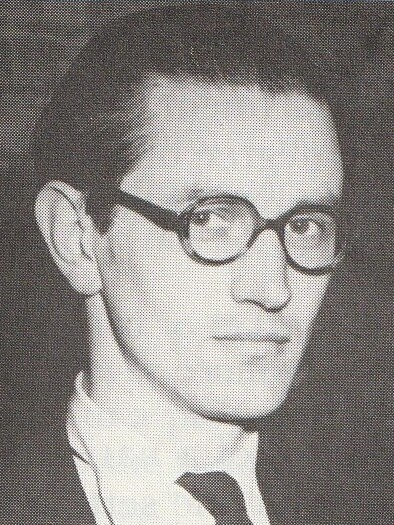
Dr. Noël Browne

In 1948 Dr. Noël Browne, a new T.D. for Clann na Poblachta, and a socialist, became Minister for Health in a coalition government. Browne had come to politics through his latter period at Newcastle Sanatorium, where he made the acquaintance, through Harry Kennedy, an Irish Times journalist who was a patient there, of Noel Hartnett, a barrister and former Fianna Fáil loyalist who had abandoned Éamon de Valera and was in the process of establishing, with his friend and mentor Seán MacBride, the Clann na Poblachta party. Browne's passionate commitment to the eradication of TB, and his admiration for Hartnett and MacBride, led him into the party, for which he successfully stood as a candidate in the general election of January 1948. Elected for the constituency of Dublin South-East, he was given access to the accumulated capital in the Irish Hospital Sweepstakes fund to launch a campaign aimed at the eradication of TB nationally.

Browne's energy and application in the prosecution of this task immediately made him a national figure. Still tubercular himself, he anticipated that his own life might be cut short by the illness at any time. As he spent lavishly on the erection of sanatoria, at that time the standard approach to the treatment of TB, he also turned his attention to another critical public health issue: neo-natal care. He was an admirer of Fianna Fáil's 1947 Health Act and intended to implement its provisions as part of a plan to reduce the alarmingly high rate of child mortality, in particular from tuberculosis, modernise the Irish healthcare system, and make it free and without means-testing for mothers and their children up to the age of 16. He was also impressed with successful medical procedural reforms in Denmark which had reduced child mortality.

In June 1950, partly influenced by the establishment of a national health service in the United Kingdom, he sent the draft of the scheme to provide free medical care for all mothers and children to the cabinet and to the Irish Medical Association. In July 1950, Browne's department formally submitted the scheme to the Association. Medical opinion had already been aroused by the 1947 Health Act, and the Association had originally opposed that bill, invoking the spectre of the "socialisation of medicine". Doctors, many of whom relied on fees relating to mothers and children for a substantial proportion of their income, became immediately hostile to the new proposals, fearing both a loss of income and a reduction to the status of a civil servant. In this opposition the Association was supported by at least one member of the coalition cabinet, Fine Gael TD Dr Thomas F. O'Higgins, the Minister for Defence and a former member of the executive of the Association.

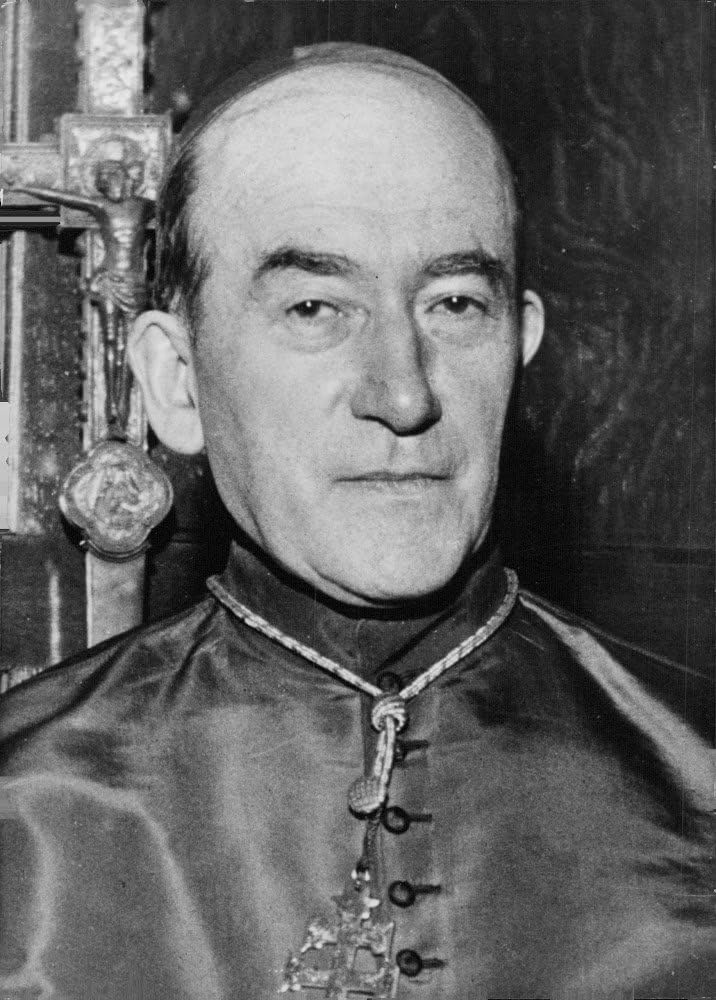
Archbishop John Charles McQuaid

Not long afterwards, and partly at the urging of key members of the medical profession, the Catholic hierarchy also met the Taoiseach to express their objections. More important than the general opposition of the medical profession was the hostility of the Archbishop of Dublin, John Charles McQuaid, who summoned Browne to his palace and read out a letter to be sent to the Taoiseach, penned by Dr James Staunton, Bishop of Ferns, which included the words "they [the Archbishops and bishops] feel bound by their office to consider whether the proposals are in accordance with Catholic moral teaching," and, "Doctors trained in institutions in which we have no confidence may be appointed as medical officers ... and may give gynaecological care not in accordance with Catholic principles". The letter further stated that health provision and physical education for children were solely the right of parents and not the State's concern. Archbishop McQuaid was chairman of some boards of directors of Dublin hospitals and exercised considerable influence over medical appointments and control over the religious orders whose members made up much of the administrative and management staff in hospitals and sanatoria. Several bishops, McQuaid included, feared that the scheme could pave the way for abortion and birth control. Concerning the term "moral teaching" in the letter to the Taoiseach, Browne received supportive advice, in secret, from Francis Cremin, a Maynooth professor of theology and canon law.

Browne met the Archbishop of Dublin and two of his colleagues and believed he had satisfied them. In fact they were far from impressed, and McQuaid brought his concerns directly to Costello. Costello, a devout Catholic who had also been opposed to the Mother and Child Scheme from the outset, told McQuaid that he would accept the Church's view on the scheme even if it meant the fall of the government. Though some clergy might have been privately sympathetic to Browne and wished to reach an accommodation, what was viewed as Browne's tactless handling of the Catholic Church forced the moderates into silence, allowing the anti-scheme members of the hierarchy under McQuaid to set the agenda. There ensued a long and unsuccessful series of attempts at mediation, complicated by misunderstandings on all sides, by Browne's increasing tendency not to involve his cabinet colleagues unless it became unavoidable, and by his own intermittent ill-health. Isolated in cabinet as a figure who did not consult with his more experienced colleagues, he also faced the hostility of his own party leader, MacBride, with whom he had fallen out, as he had with most members of the Clann na Poblachta Parliamentary Party, who resented his appointment to cabinet over the heads of more senior colleagues.

On 21 March 1951, frustrated at the continued delaying tactics of the doctors, Browne requested the government press office to release a statement which, among other things, declared that the Mother and Child Scheme was government policy. Costello had publication stopped, insisting that Browne clear up the dispute with the Catholic hierarchy before anything else could be done. A further meeting with McQuaid dispelled any remaining belief Browne held that he had satisfied the bishops. Browne agreed that the hierarchy should adjudicate on the scheme. On 5 April 1951, McQuaid informed Costello that the scheme was "opposed to Catholic social teaching". McQuaid subsequently asked Costello to inform his cabinet colleagues that the hierarchy's letter "was a definite condemnation of the scheme on moral grounds", asserting that Catholic social teaching and Catholic moral teaching were one and the same in matters social. He also pointed out the number of times the bishops had used the phrase "this particular scheme", implying that an alternative could be acceptable.

The cabinet duly met, McQuaid's letter was read, and Browne found himself in a minority of one. Faced with the categorical and uncompromising opposition of both the medical profession and the bishops, Browne was abandoned, in succession, by the Taoiseach, by other members of the cabinet, and ultimately by his own party leader, MacBride, who requested Browne's resignation on 10 April 1951. Browne resigned with effect from 11 April, submitting his resignation to Costello for submission to President O'Kelly. In his resignation statement, Browne told the House:

I had been led to believe that my insistence on the exclusion of a means test had the full support of my colleagues in the Government. I now know that it had not. Furthermore, the Hierarchy has informed the Government that they must regard the mother and child scheme proposed by me as opposed to Catholic social teaching. This decision I, as a Catholic, immediately accepted without hesitation.

Browne controversially issued to the newspapers the full correspondence between himself, his cabinet colleagues, and members of the hierarchy on the issue, an act without precedent in Irish political history to that point. On 12 April 1951, The Irish Times published the correspondence on its front page. The paper's editorial, written by its Scottish-born Protestant editor RM Smyllie, concluded: "The most serious revelation, however, is that the Roman Catholic Church would seem to be the effective Government of this country." During the subsequent Dáil debate, Tánaiste and Labour Party leader William Norton claimed that had the matter been handled with greater tact and forbearance, the crisis need not have arisen.

== Aftermath ==
The following month a general election was called and in June 1951 a new government was formed as a result.

A derivative of the scheme was implemented subsequently by the Fianna Fáil government which returned to power as a result of the general election. This achieved legislative effect in the 1953 Health Act; this and later legislation that created the Voluntary Health Insurance Board in 1957. Although a single-payer system emerged in Ireland, the 1957 Act ended immediate attempts to implement a National Health Service-style healthcare model. Thus the private and public systems existing side-by-side, later reinforced by the 1970 Health Act, which changed healthcare from the responsibility of the county to a smaller number of regional health boards. The transfer of responsibility from local authority to state led to the introduction of the Unmarried Mother's Allowance in 1973, the first direct State payment to assist an unmarried woman to rear her child in the community.
