= National Progressive Democrats =

Irish political party, 1958 to 1963

- Founders: Noël Browne, Jack McQuillan
- Founded: 1958
- Dissolved: 1963
- Merged into: Labour Party
- Ideology: Socialism; Progressivism
- Political position: Left Wing

The National Progressive Democrats was a small socialist political party in Ireland, active between 1958 and 1963.

The party was founded as a left-wing progressive secular party. Its founders were Noël Browne (former Minister for Health) and Jack McQuillan, former members of the social democratic wing of Clann na Poblachta. The party was noted for its vigorous role in Dáil Éireann. Between 1958 and 1961, 7 of the 9 motions discussed in Private Member's Time had been proposed by one of them. In 1961 and 1962, they asked 1,400 parliamentary questions, 17% of the total. Taoiseach Seán Lemass paid them a compliment by referring to them as "the real opposition". Both were re-elected at the 1961 general election, but the party won little support as it fielded only one other candidate.

The party was disbanded when it merged into the Labour Party in 1963. However, both Browne and McQuillan lost their seats in the next election contesting for the Labour Party.

== List of National Progressive Democrat candidates ==
Election	Constituency	Candidate	1st Pref. votes	%
1958 Dublin South-Central by-election	Dublin South-Central	Noel Hartnett	2,688	15.3
1961 general election	Carlow–Kilkenny	Kathleen Brady	1,484	3.4
1961 general election	Dublin South-East	Noël Browne	4,717	19.1
1961 general election	Roscommon	Jack McQuillan	5,289	15.1

== General election results ==
Election	Seats won	±	Position	First Pref votes	%	Government	Leader
1961	2 / 144	▲2	▲4th	11,490	1.0%	Opposition	Noël Browne
