= Seán MacBride =

Irish republican activist, politician, and diplomat (1904–1988)

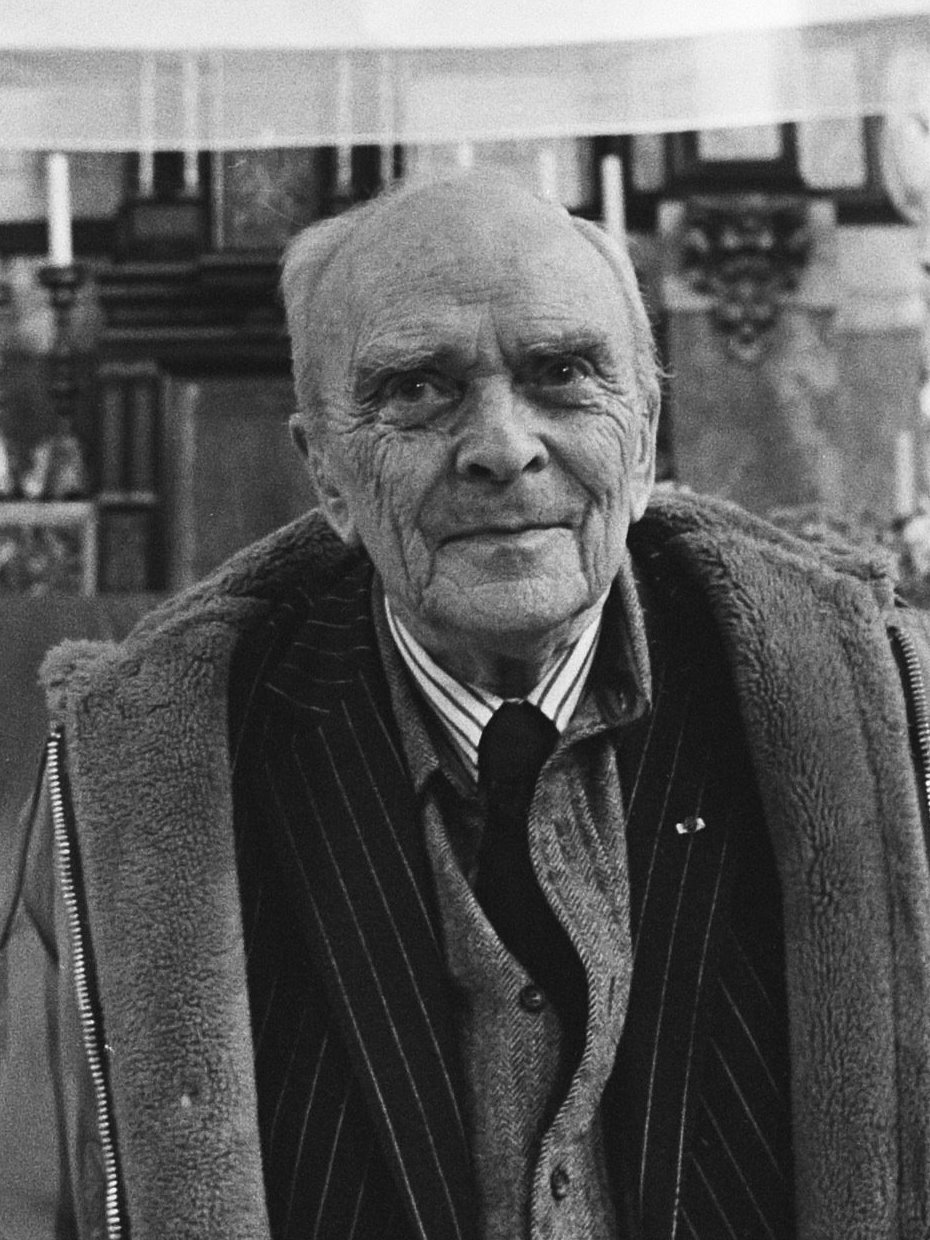
- MacBride in 1984

Minister for External Affairs
- In office 18 February 1948 – 13 June 1951
- Taoiseach: John A. Costello
- Preceded by: Éamon de Valera
- Succeeded by: Frank Aiken

Leader of Clann na Poblachta
- In office 21 January 1946 – 3 June 1965
- Preceded by: New office
- Succeeded by: Office abolished

Chief of Staff of the IRA
- In office 24 April 1936 – 1937
- Preceded by: Moss Twomey
- Succeeded by: Tom Barry

Teachta Dála
- In office February 1948 – March 1957
- Constituency: Dublin South-West
- In office October 1947 – February 1948
- Constituency: Dublin County

Personal details
- Born: 26 January 1904 Paris, France
- Died: 15 January 1988 (aged 83) Dublin, Ireland
- Resting place: Glasnevin Cemetery, Dublin, Ireland
- Party: Sinn Féin (1918–1931); Saor Éire (1931); Clann na Poblachta (1946 onwards)
- Spouse: Catalina Bulfin (m. 1924–1976)
- Children: 2
- Parents: John MacBride (father); Maud Gonne (mother)
- Relatives: Iseult Gonne (half-sister)
- Education: University College Dublin

Seán MacBride (26 January 1904 – 15 January 1988) was an Irish republican activist, politician, and diplomat who served as Minister for External Affairs from 1948 to 1951, Leader of Clann na Poblachta from 1946 to 1965 and Chief of Staff of the IRA from 1936 to 1937. He served as a Teachta Dála (TD) from 1947 to 1957.

Rising from a domestic Irish political career, he founded or participated in multiple international organisations of the 20th century, including the United Nations, the Council of Europe and Amnesty International. He received the Nobel Peace Prize in 1974, the Lenin Peace Prize for 1975–1976 and the UNESCO Silver Medal for Service in 1980.

== Early life ==
MacBride was born in Paris in 1904, the son of Maud Gonne and Major John MacBride. As a founding member of Inghinidhe na hÉireann and Cumann na mBan, his mother was to become a prominent figure in Irish nationalist and republican circles. Later, in the 1930s, she became a devotee of the social credit ideas of Major C.H. Douglas and was "noisily anti-Semitic". His father had led the Irish Transvaal Brigade against the British in the Second Boer War. Within a year of MacBride's birth, he returned to Dublin where, following his participation in the Easter Rising, John MacBride was court-martialed by the British and executed in May 1916.

MacBride's first language was French, and he retained, or, as some would claim, affected, a French accent in the English language for the rest of his life. MacBride first studied at the Jesuit Lycée Saint-Louis-de-Gonzague, and remained in Paris until his father's execution in 1916, when he was sent to school at Mount St Benedict's, Gorey, County Wexford in Ireland, and briefly at the Downside School.

MacBride first became involved in politics during the 1918 Irish general election in which he was active for Sinn Féin. The following year in 1919, aged 15, he lied about his age to join the Irish Volunteers, which fought as part of the Irish Republican Army, and took part in the Irish War of Independence. He opposed the 1921 Anglo-Irish Treaty and was imprisoned by the Irish Free State during the Irish Civil War.

== Anti-Treaty IRA, cooperation with the Soviets ==
On his release in 1924, MacBride studied law at University College Dublin and resumed his IRA activities. He worked briefly for Éamon de Valera as his personal secretary, travelling with him to Rome to meet various dignitaries.

In January 1925, on his twenty-first birthday, MacBride married Catalina "Kid" Bulfin, a woman four years his senior who shared his political views. Bulfin was the daughter of the Irish nationalist publisher and travel-writer William Bulfin.

Before returning to Dublin in 1927, where he became the IRA's Director of Intelligence, MacBride worked as a journalist in Paris and London.

According to historians Tom Mahon and James J. Gillogly, recently deciphered IRA messages from the 1920s reveal that the organisation's two main sources of funding were Clan na Gael and the Soviet Union. The messages further reveal that MacBride, before becoming IRA Director of Intelligence, was involved in the espionage activities in Great Britain of GRU spymaster Walter Krivitsky, whom ciphered IRA communications referred to only by the code name "James".

In addition to supplying the USSR with detailed information on Royal Navy ships and Royal Air Force aeroplane engines, MacBride provided Soviet agents with "a brief specification and a complete drawing" of ASDIC, an early sonar system for detecting submarines, at a covert meeting in Amsterdam during the autumn of 1926. MacBride also assisted the GRU by providing forged passports to Soviet intelligence operatives who were at risk of capture.

In October 1926, MacBride sent a ciphered report from Paris to his IRA superiors about Soviet counterfeiting operations, saying, "Several bad Bank of England notes have been passed here lately. These are said to emanate from Russia."

Soon after his return to Dublin in 1927, he was arrested and charged with the murder of politician Kevin O'Higgins, who had been assassinated near his home in Booterstown, County Dublin. At his trial, however, Cumann na nGaedheal politician Bryan Cooper testified as a witness for the defence that, at the time of Kevin O'Higgins' murder, both he and MacBride had been aboard a ferry travelling from Britain to Ireland. MacBride was then charged with being a subversive and interned in Mountjoy Prison.

In September 1927, Krivitsky sent the IRA a message from Amsterdam, demanding to see MacBride immediately, claiming to have a "present" he was anxious to give away, and naming a cafe where the meeting could take place. As MacBride was then imprisoned in Dublin, the IRA's chief of staff, Moss Twomey, replied that the request was "rather awkward and impossible to fulfill at the present". In response, Twomey and two other senior IRA members travelled to Amsterdam and met with Krivitsky instead.

In 1929 an Irish section of the League Against Imperialism was formed and MacBride served as its secretary. Aimed at creating a "mass anti-imperialist movement", the organization was founded with the support of the Comintern.

Towards the end of the 1920s, after many supporters had left to join Fianna Fáil, some members of the IRA started pushing for a more left-wing agenda. After the IRA Army Council voted down the idea, MacBride launched a new movement, Saor Éire ("Free Ireland"), in 1931. Although it was a non-military organisation, Saor Éire was declared unlawful along with the IRA, Cumann na mBan and nine other bodies. MacBride, meanwhile, became the security services' number-one target.

In 1936, the IRA's chief of staff Moss Twomey was sent to prison for three years; he was replaced by MacBride. At the time, the movement was in a state of disarray, with conflicts between several factions and personalities. Tom Barry was appointed chief of staff to head up a military operation against the British, an action with which MacBride did not agree.

In 1937, MacBride was called to the bar. He then resigned from the IRA when the Constitution of Ireland was enacted later that year. As a barrister, MacBride frequently defended IRA prisoners of the state (Thomas Hart & Patrick McGrath). MacBride was unsuccessful in preventing the 1944 death by hanging of Charlie Kerins, who had been convicted based on fingerprint evidence of the 1942 ambush and murder of Garda Detective Sergeant Denis O'Brien. In 1946, during the inquest into the death of Seán McCaughey, MacBride embarrassed the Irish State by forcing them to admit that conditions in Portlaoise Prison were inhumane.

== Clann na Poblachta, Minister for External Affairs ==
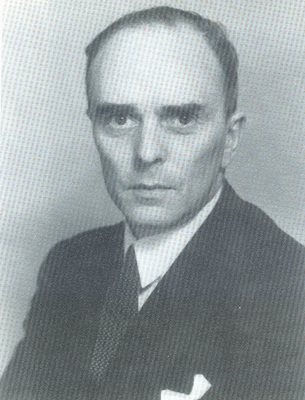
MacBride circa 1947 when he founded Clann na Poblachta

In 1946, MacBride founded the republican party Clann na Poblachta. He hoped it would replace Fianna Fáil as Ireland's major political party. In October 1947, he won the Dublin County by-election. On the same day, Patrick Kinane also won the Tipperary by-election for Clann na Poblachta.

However, at the 1948 general election Clann na Poblachta won only ten seats. The party joined Fine Gael, the Labour Party, the National Labour Party, Clann na Talmhan and several independents to form the First Inter-Party Government with Fine Gael TD John A. Costello as Taoiseach. Richard Mulcahy was the Leader of Fine Gael, but MacBride and many other Irish Republicans had never forgiven Mulcahy for his role in carrying out 77 executions under the government of the Irish Free State in the 1920s during the Irish Civil War. To gain the support of Clann na Poblachta, Mulcahy stepped aside in favour of Costello. Two Clann na Poblachta TDs were appointed to cabinet; MacBride became Minister for External Affairs while Noël Browne became Minister for Health.

On his ministerial accession, MacBride sent a telegram to Pope Pius XII offering:

...to repose at the feet of Your Holiness the assurance of our filial loyalty and our devotion to Your August Person, as well as our firm resolve to be guided in all our work by the teaching of Christ and to strive for the attainment of a social order in Ireland based on Christian principles.

At MacBride's suggestion, Costello nominated the northern Protestant Denis Ireland to Seanad Éireann, the first resident of Northern Ireland to be appointed as a member of the Oireachtas. While a Senator (1948–1951), Ireland was Irish representative to the Council of Europe assisting MacBride in the leading role he was to play in securing acceptance of the European Convention on Human Rights—signed in Rome on 4 November 1950. In 1950, MacBride was president of the Council of Foreign Ministers of the Council of Europe, and he was vice-president of the Organisation for European Economic Co-operation (OEEC, later OECD) in 1948–1951. He was responsible for Ireland not joining the North Atlantic Treaty Organisation (NATO).

He was instrumental in passing of The Republic of Ireland Act 1948, which repealed the External Relations Act, and came into force in 1949. It declared that Ireland may officially be described as the Republic of Ireland and that the president of Ireland had the executive authority of the state in its external relations.

In 1951, MacBride ordered Noël Browne to resign as a minister over the Mother and Child Scheme after it was attacked by the Irish Catholic hierarchy and the Irish medical establishment. Whatever the merits of the scheme, or of Browne, MacBride concluded in a cabinet memorandum:

Even if, as Catholics, we were prepared to take the responsibility of disregarding [the Hierarchy's] views, which I do not think we can do, it would be politically impossible to do so ... We are dealing with the considered views of the leaders of the Catholic Church to which the vast majority of our people belong; these views cannot be ignored.

Also in 1951, Clann na Poblachta was reduced to two seats after the general election. MacBride held his seat and was re-elected again in 1954. Opposing the internment of IRA suspects during the Border Campaign (1956–1962), he contested both the 1957 and 1961 general elections but failed to be elected both times. He then retired from politics and continued practising as a barrister.

== International roles and commissions ==
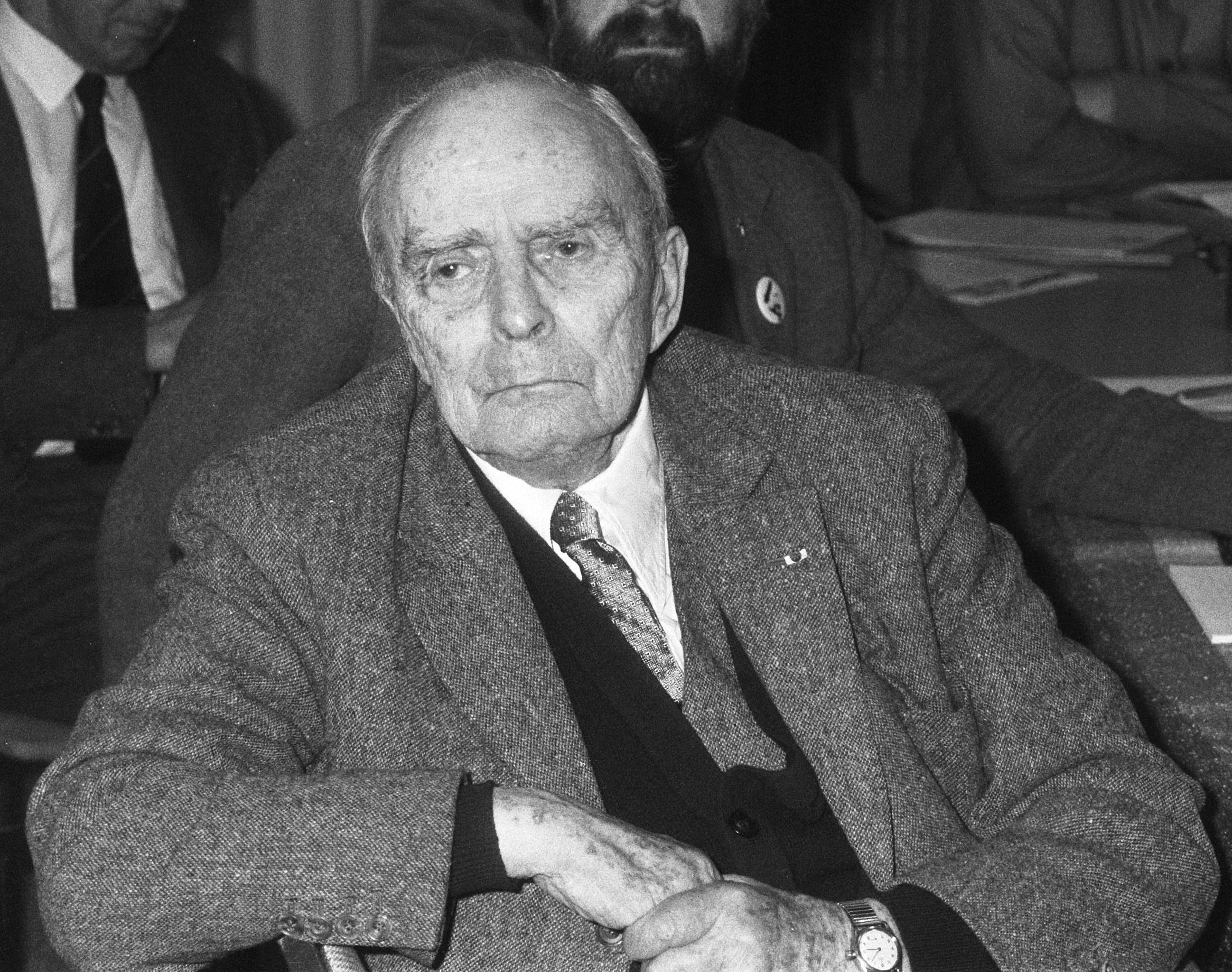
Seán MacBride in 1986

After retiring from politics in Ireland, MacBride assumed various international commissions and roles. He was among a group of lawyers who founded JUSTICE—the UK-based human rights and law reform organisation—initially to monitor the show trials after the 1956 Budapest uprising. Later it became the UK section of the International Commission of Jurists for which MacBride, from 1963 to 1971, was Secretary-General. In 1966, his standing on the Commission was unsuccessfully challenged by US claims that he had been involved with a Central Intelligence Agency funding operation.

In 1961, MacBride was a co-founder of Amnesty International, and he served as its International Chairman until 1975.

In 1963, he had helped draft the constitution of the Organisation of African Unity (OAU); following consultations on the constitutions of newly independent Ghana, Zambia and Tanzania.

In 1968, MacBride was elected chair and, in 1975, president of the International Peace Bureau in Geneva, a position he retained until 1985. He was also involved in the International Prisoners of Conscience Fund.

In the course of the 1970s, he held various positions with the United Nations. In 1973, he was elected by the UN General Assembly to the post of High Commissioner for Namibia, with the rank of Assistant Secretary-General. It was thought that, represented by a man whose father had volunteered to fight alongside their forefathers, the Afrikaner leadership of Apartheid South Africa would find the UN's assurances in return for a withdrawal from Namibia more credible.

In 1977, MacBride was appointed president of the International Commission for the Study of Communication Problems, set up by UNESCO. In 1980, this produced the controversial MacBride Report which called for policies to reduce the international dominance of the Western media.

During the 1980s, he initiated the Appeal by Lawyers against Nuclear War which was jointly sponsored by the International Peace Bureau and the International Progress Organization. In close cooperation with Francis Boyle and Hans Köchler of the International Progress Organization he lobbied the General Assembly for a resolution demanding an Advisory Opinion from the International Court of Justice on the legality of nuclear arms. The Advisory Opinion on the Legality of the Threat or Use of Nuclear Weapons was eventually handed down by the ICJ in 1996.

In 1982, MacBride was chairman of the International Commission to enquire into reported violations of International Law by Israel during its invasion of the Lebanon. The other members were Richard Falk, Kader Asmal, Brian Bercusson, Géraud de la Pradelle, and Stefan Wild. The commission's report, which concluded that "the government of Israel has committed acts of aggression contrary to international law", was published in 1983 under the title Israel in Lebanon.

== Nobel Peace Prize and other international honours ==
MacBride's work was awarded the Nobel Peace Prize (1974) as a man who "mobilised the conscience of the world in the fight against injustice". He shared the prize with Eisaku Sato, the former Japanese Prime Minister acknowledged for his commitment to peace and non-proliferation.

Other international honours followed: the Lenin Peace Prize in 1975; the Golden Plate Award of the American Academy of Achievement in 1978; and the UNESCO Silver Medal for Service (1980). He received the Lenin Peace Prize for his opposition to what MacBride referred to as "this absolutely obscene arms race." He was one of only two to win both the Lenin and Nobel peace prizes, the other being Linus Pauling.

== Last Irish interventions ==
In 1977, in the midst of the Northern Ireland Troubles, MacBride, co-operating with Desmond Boal (QC and former chairman of Ian Paisley's Democratic Unionist Party), acted as joint mediator in confidential negotiations between the Provisional IRA (PIRA) and the Ulster Volunteer Force about a federal settlement for Ireland. Their efforts included a meeting, brokered by West Belfast priest Des Wilson, between Boal and Gerry Adams. Inasmuch as their exchange was "frank", Adams found the discussion "constructive", but it failed to identify common political ground.

In 1984, MacBride was one of four well-known Irish activists, two Catholics and two Protestants, who endorsed a set of fair-employment guidelines for American investment in Northern Ireland, intended to redress a history of sectarian discrimination. The campaign for what became known as the MacBride Principles resulted in both British and American legislation.

In the Irish Republic, MacBride edited a 1981 report of a Commission of Enquiry into the Irish Penal System. Crime and Punishment broadly condemned the country's prisons, unreformed since independence, for failing to address the task of offender rehabilitation and consequently for its high degree of recidivism.

In 1983, MacBride voted yes to the Eighth Amendment to the Constitution, enshrining the legal ban on abortion, and wrote a newspaper article two days before stating his position. In 1985, he supported the largely female workforce in the Dunnes Stores Strike and attended at least one of their rallies.

== Later life and death ==
In his later years, MacBride lived in his mother's home, Roebuck House, which served as a meeting place for many years for Irish nationalists, as well as in the Parisian arrondissement where he grew up with his mother.

Seán MacBride died in Dublin on 15 January 1988, eleven days before his 84th birthday. He is buried in Glasnevin Cemetery alongside his mother, and his wife, who died in 1976.

On the occasion of MacBride's death, Oliver Tambo of the African National Congress (ANC), stated "Seán MacBride will always be remembered for the concrete leadership he provided to the liberation movement and people of Namibia and South Africa. Driven by his own personal and political insight arising out of the cause of national freedom in Ireland ... our debt to him can never be repaid."

== Legacy ==
Streets in Windhoek, Namibia and Amsterdam are named after him. The Headquarters of Amnesty International Ireland is called 'Seán MacBride House' in his honour. and the International Peace Bureau likewise named the 'Seán MacBride Prize' in his name.

A bust of MacBride was unveiled in Iveagh House, headquarters of the Irish Department of Foreign Affairs in 1995.

== In popular culture ==
A novel, The Casting of Mr O'Shaughnessy, was published in 1995 (revised edition 2002) by Éamon Delaney in which the eponymous Mr O'Shaughnessy was, in the author's own words "partly, but quite obviously, based on the career of the colourful Seán MacBride".

== Career summary ==
- 1946–1965 Leader of Clann na Poblachta
- 1947–1958 Member of Dáil Éireann
- 1948–1951 Minister for External Affairs of Ireland in Inter-Party Government
- 1948–1951 Vice-president of the Organization for European Economic Cooperation (OEEC)
- 1950 President, Committee of Ministers of Council of Europe
- 1954 Offered but declined, Ministerial office in Irish Government
- 1963–1971 Secretary-General, International Commission of Jurists
- 1966 Consultant to the Pontifical Commission on Justice and Peace
- 1961–1975 Chairman Amnesty International Executive
- 1968–1974 Chairman of the Executive International Peace Bureau
- 1975–1985 President of the Executive International Peace Bureau
- 1968–1974 Chairman Special Committee of International NGOs on Human Rights (Geneva)
- 1973 Vice-chairman, Congress of World Peace Forces (Moscow, October 1973)
- 1973 Vice-president, World Federation of United Nations Associations
- 1973–1977 Elected by the General Assembly of the United Nations to the post of United Nations Commissioner for Namibia with the rank of Assistant Secretary-General of the United Nations
- 1977–1980 Chairman, Commission on International Communication for UNESCO
- 1982 Chairman of the International Commission to enquire into reported violations of International Law by Israel during its invasion of Lebanon

Political offices
Preceded by Éamon de Valera	Minister for External Affairs; 1948–1951	Succeeded by Frank Aiken
Party political offices
New political party	Leader of Clann na Poblachta; 1946–1965	Succeeded by Party disbanded

Dáil	Election	Deputy (Party)	Deputy (Party)	Deputy (Party)	Deputy (Party)	Deputy (Party)	Deputy (Party)	Deputy (Party)	Deputy (Party)
2nd	1921	Michael Derham (SF)	George Gavan Duffy (SF)	Séamus Dwyer (SF)	Desmond FitzGerald (SF)	Frank Lawless (SF)	Margaret Pearse (SF)	6 seats 1921–1923	
3rd	1922	Michael Derham (PT-SF)	George Gavan Duffy (PT-SF)	Thomas Johnson (Lab)	Desmond FitzGerald (PT-SF)	Darrell Figgis (Ind)	John Rooney (FP)	6 seats 1921–1923	
4th	1923	Michael Derham (CnaG)	Bryan Cooper (Ind)	Thomas Johnson (Lab)	Desmond FitzGerald (CnaG)	Darrell Figgis (Ind)	John Good (Ind)	Kathleen Lynn (Rep)	Kevin O'Higgins (CnaG)
4th	1924 by-election	Batt O'Connor (CnaG)	Bryan Cooper (Ind)	Thomas Johnson (Lab)	Desmond FitzGerald (CnaG)	Darrell Figgis (Ind)	John Good (Ind)	Kathleen Lynn (Rep)	Kevin O'Higgins (CnaG)
4th	1926 by-election	Batt O'Connor (CnaG)	Bryan Cooper (Ind)	Thomas Johnson (Lab)	Desmond FitzGerald (CnaG)	William Norton (Lab)	John Good (Ind)	Kathleen Lynn (Rep)	Kevin O'Higgins (CnaG)
5th	1927 (Jun)	Batt O'Connor (CnaG)	Bryan Cooper (Ind)	Thomas Johnson (Lab)	Desmond FitzGerald (CnaG)	Patrick Belton (FF)	John Good (Ind)	Seán MacEntee (FF)	Kevin O'Higgins (CnaG)
5th	1927 by-election	Batt O'Connor (CnaG)	Bryan Cooper (Ind)	Thomas Johnson (Lab)	Desmond FitzGerald (CnaG)	Patrick Belton (FF)	John Good (Ind)	Seán MacEntee (FF)	Gearóid O'Sullivan (CnaG)
6th	1927 (Sep)	Batt O'Connor (CnaG)	Bryan Cooper (CnaG)	Joseph Murphy (Ind)	Desmond FitzGerald (CnaG)	Seán Brady (FF)	John Good (Ind)	Seán MacEntee (FF)	Gearóid O'Sullivan (CnaG)
6th	1930 by-election	Batt O'Connor (CnaG)	Thomas Finlay (CnaG)	Joseph Murphy (Ind)	Desmond FitzGerald (CnaG)	Seán Brady (FF)	John Good (Ind)	Seán MacEntee (FF)	Gearóid O'Sullivan (CnaG)
7th	1932	Batt O'Connor (CnaG)	Thomas Finlay (CnaG)	Patrick Curran (Lab)	Henry Dockrell (CnaG)	Seán Brady (FF)	John Good (Ind)	Seán MacEntee (FF)	Gearóid O'Sullivan (CnaG)
8th	1933	Batt O'Connor (CnaG)	John A. Costello (CnaG)	Margaret Mary Pearse (FF)	Henry Dockrell (CnaG)	Seán Brady (FF)	John Good (Ind)	Seán MacEntee (FF)	Gearóid O'Sullivan (CnaG)
8th	1935 by-election	Cecil Lavery (FG)	John A. Costello (CnaG)	Margaret Mary Pearse (FF)	Henry Dockrell (CnaG)	Seán Brady (FF)	John Good (Ind)	Seán MacEntee (FF)	Gearóid O'Sullivan (CnaG)
9th	1937	Cecil Lavery (FG)	Henry Dockrell (FG)	Gerrard McGowan (Lab)	Patrick Fogarty (FF)	Seán Brady (FF)	5 seats 1937–1948		
10th	1938	Patrick Belton (FG)	Henry Dockrell (FG)	Thomas Mullen (FF)	Patrick Fogarty (FF)	Seán Brady (FF)	5 seats 1937–1948		
11th	1943	Liam Cosgrave (FG)	Henry Dockrell (FG)	James Tunney (Lab)	Patrick Fogarty (FF)	Seán Brady (FF)	5 seats 1937–1948		
12th	1944	Liam Cosgrave (FG)	Henry Dockrell (FG)	Patrick Burke (FF)	Patrick Fogarty (FF)	Seán Brady (FF)	5 seats 1937–1948		
12th	1947 by-election	Liam Cosgrave (FG)	Henry Dockrell (FG)	Patrick Burke (FF)	Seán MacBride (CnaP)	Seán Brady (FF)	5 seats 1937–1948		
13th	1948	Éamon Rooney (FG)	Seán Dunne (Lab)	Patrick Burke (FF)	3 seats 1948–1961				
14th	1951	Éamon Rooney (FG)	Seán Dunne (Lab)	Patrick Burke (FF)	3 seats 1948–1961				
15th	1954	Éamon Rooney (FG)	Seán Dunne (Lab)	Patrick Burke (FF)	3 seats 1948–1961				
16th	1957	Éamon Rooney (FG)	Kevin Boland (FF)	Patrick Burke (FF)	3 seats 1948–1961				
17th	1961	Éamon Rooney (FG)	Kevin Boland (FF)	Patrick Burke (FF)	Mark Clinton (FG)	Seán Dunne (Ind)	5 seats 1961–1969		
18th	1965	Des Foley (FF)	Kevin Boland (FF)	Patrick Burke (FF)	Mark Clinton (FG)	Seán Dunne (Lab)	5 seats 1961–1969		
19th	1969	Constituency abolished. See Dublin County North and Dublin County South							

Dáil	Election	Deputy (Party)	Deputy (Party)	Deputy (Party)	Deputy (Party)	Deputy (Party)
13th	1948	Seán MacBride (CnaP)	Peadar Doyle (FG)	Bernard Butler (FF)	Michael O'Higgins (FG)	Robert Briscoe (FF)
14th	1951	Seán MacBride (CnaP)	Peadar Doyle (FG)	Bernard Butler (FF)	Michael ffrench-O'Carroll (Ind.)	Robert Briscoe (FF)
15th	1954	Seán MacBride (CnaP)	Peadar Doyle (FG)	Bernard Butler (FF)	Michael O'Higgins (FG)	Robert Briscoe (FF)
15th	1956 by-election	Seán MacBride (CnaP)	Noel Lemass (FF)	Bernard Butler (FF)	Michael O'Higgins (FG)	Robert Briscoe (FF)
16th	1957	James Carroll (Ind.)	Noel Lemass (FF)	Bernard Butler (FF)	Michael O'Higgins (FG)	Robert Briscoe (FF)
16th	1959 by-election	James Carroll (Ind.)	Noel Lemass (FF)	Richie Ryan (FG)	Michael O'Higgins (FG)	Robert Briscoe (FF)
17th	1961	James Carroll (Ind.)	Noel Lemass (FF)	Richie Ryan (FG)	James O'Keeffe (FG)	Robert Briscoe (FF)
18th	1965	John O'Connell (Lab)	Noel Lemass (FF)	Richie Ryan (FG)	Joseph Dowling (FF)	Ben Briscoe (FF)
19th	1969	John O'Connell (Lab)	Noel Lemass (FF)	Seán Dunne (Lab)	Joseph Dowling (FF)	4 seats 1969–1977
19th	1970 by-election	John O'Connell (Lab)	Noel Lemass (FF)	Seán Sherwin (FF)	Joseph Dowling (FF)	4 seats 1969–1977
20th	1973	John O'Connell (Lab)	Noel Lemass (FF)	Declan Costello (FG)	Joseph Dowling (FF)	4 seats 1969–1977
20th	1976 by-election	John O'Connell (Lab)	Brendan Halligan (Lab)	Declan Costello (FG)	Joseph Dowling (FF)	4 seats 1969–1977
21st	1977	Constituency abolished. See Dublin Ballyfermot				

Dáil	Election	Deputy (Party)	Deputy (Party)	Deputy (Party)	Deputy (Party)	Deputy (Party)
22nd	1981	Seán Walsh (FF)	Larry McMahon (FG)	Mary Harney (FF)	Mervyn Taylor (Lab)	4 seats 1981–1992
23rd	1982 (Feb)	Seán Walsh (FF)	Larry McMahon (FG)	Mary Harney (FF)	Mervyn Taylor (Lab)	4 seats 1981–1992
24th	1982 (Nov)	Seán Walsh (FF)	Michael O'Leary (FG)	Mary Harney (FF)	Mervyn Taylor (Lab)	4 seats 1981–1992
25th	1987	Seán Walsh (FF)	Chris Flood (FF)	Mary Harney (PDs)	Mervyn Taylor (Lab)	4 seats 1981–1992
26th	1989	Pat Rabbitte (WP)	Chris Flood (FF)	Mary Harney (PDs)	Mervyn Taylor (Lab)	4 seats 1981–1992
27th	1992	Pat Rabbitte (DL)	Chris Flood (FF)	Mary Harney (PDs)	Mervyn Taylor (Lab)	Éamonn Walsh (Lab)
28th	1997	Pat Rabbitte (DL)	Chris Flood (FF)	Mary Harney (PDs)	Conor Lenihan (FF)	Brian Hayes (FG)
29th	2002	Pat Rabbitte (Lab)	Charlie O'Connor (FF)	Seán Crowe (SF)	Conor Lenihan (FF)	4 seats 2002–2016
30th	2007	Pat Rabbitte (Lab)	Charlie O'Connor (FF)	Brian Hayes (FG)	Conor Lenihan (FF)	4 seats 2002–2016
31st	2011	Pat Rabbitte (Lab)	Eamonn Maloney (Lab)	Brian Hayes (FG)	Seán Crowe (SF)	4 seats 2002–2016
31st	2014 by-election	Pat Rabbitte (Lab)	Eamonn Maloney (Lab)	Paul Murphy (AAA)	Seán Crowe (SF)	4 seats 2002–2016
32nd	2016	Colm Brophy (FG)	John Lahart (FF)	Paul Murphy (AAA–PBP)	Seán Crowe (SF)	Katherine Zappone (Ind.)
33rd	2020	Colm Brophy (FG)	John Lahart (FF)	Paul Murphy (S–PBP)	Seán Crowe (SF)	Francis Noel Duffy (GP)
34th	2024	Colm Brophy (FG)	John Lahart (FF)	Paul Murphy (PBP–S)	Seán Crowe (SF)	Ciarán Ahern (Lab)
