= Government of the 13th Dáil =

Government of Ireland 1948 to 1951

5th government of Ireland
- Government of Ireland

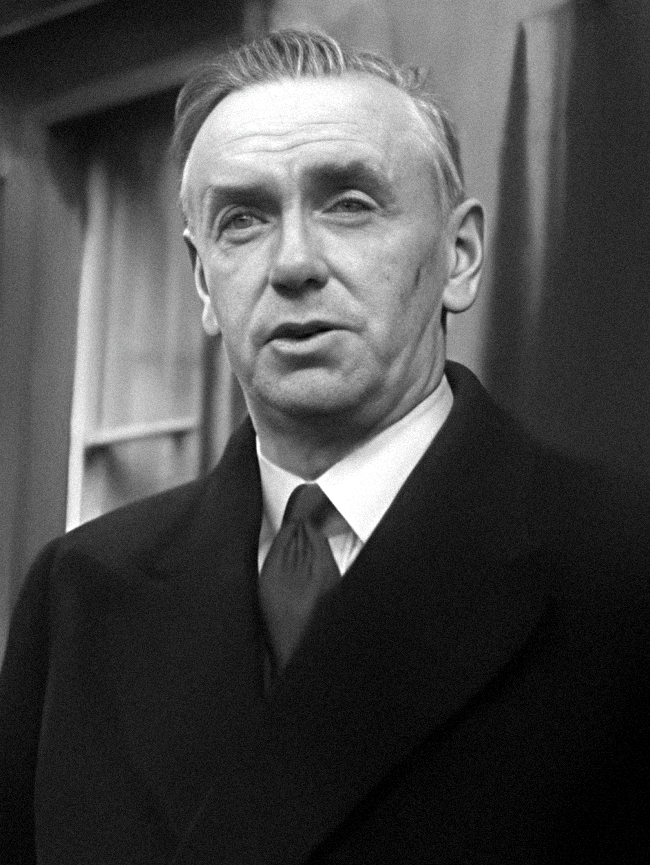
- Date formed: 18 February 1948
- Date dissolved: 13 June 1951

People and organisations
- President: Seán T. O'Kelly
- Taoiseach: John A. Costello
- Tánaiste: William Norton
- Total no. of members: 12
- Member parties: Fine Gael; Labour Party; Clann na Poblachta; Clann na Talmhan; National Labour Party; Monetary Reform; Independent
- Status in legislature: Majority big-tent coalition 75 / 147 (51%)
- Opposition party: Fianna Fáil
- Opposition leader: Éamon de Valera

History
- Election: 1948 general election
- Legislature terms: 13th Dáil; 6th Seanad
- Predecessor: 4th government
- Successor: 6th government

The 5th government of Ireland (18 February 1948 – 13 June 1951), commonly known as the First inter-party government, was formed after the 1948 general election held to the 13th Dáil on 4 February. It was an Irish government of Fine Gael, the Labour Party, Clann na Poblachta, Clann na Talmhan and the National Labour Party—and one TD who was an independent, James Dillon (who had resigned from Fine Gael after opposing Ireland's neutrality in World War II). The parties had many different aims and viewpoints, but opposition to Fianna Fáil overcame difficulties in forming a government; Éamon de Valera had led a series of single-party Fianna Fáil governments since 1932. The cabinet was made up of representatives of all parties, and ministers were given a great degree of independence. Some key events during the lifetime of the government include the declaration of the Republic of Ireland in 1948 and the crisis surrounding the Mother and Child Scheme in 1951. It lasted for 3 years, 115 days.

== Formation ==
Fianna Fáil had been in office continuously since 1932, with Éamon de Valera as head of government (titled as President of the Executive Council of the Irish Free State until 1937, and from then as Taoiseach). However, after the 1948 general election, the party was six seats short of a majority.

At first, it seemed that de Valera would attempt to form a minority government. Negotiations for confidence and supply with the National Labour Party failed when National Labour insisted on a formal coalition; at that time, Fianna Fáil would not enter coalitions with other parties. Nevertheless, it initially appeared that Fianna Fáil was the only party that could realistically form a government. Despite losing its majority, Fianna Fáil was by far the largest party in the Dáil, with 37 more seats than the next-largest party, Fine Gael.

However, the other parties realised that if they banded together, they would only have only one seat fewer than Fianna Fáil, and could form a government with the support of at least seven independents. It was a foregone conclusion that Fine Gael would head such a coalition, as Fine Gael was the second-largest party in the Dáil by some margin (no other party in the prospective coalition had more than 30 TDs).

In the normal course of events, Fine Gael leader Richard Mulcahy would have been the prospective coalition's nominee for Taoiseach. However, Clann na Poblachta leader Seán MacBride refused to serve under Mulcahy because of his role in carrying out 77 executions under the government of the Irish Free State in the early 1920s during the Irish Civil War. Accordingly, Mulcahy bowed out in favour of former Attorney General John A. Costello.

Costello found himself as leader of a disparate group of young and old politicians, republicans and Free Staters, conservatives and socialists. The government survived for three years, however, through the skill of Costello as Taoiseach and the independence of various ministers.

== Nomination of Taoiseach ==
The 13th Dáil first met on 18 February 1948. In the debate on the nomination of Taoiseach, Fianna Fáil leader and outgoing Taoiseach Éamon de Valera and John A. Costello of Fine Gael were both proposed. The nomination of de Valera was defeated by 70 to 75, while the nomination of Costello was approved by 75 to 68. Costello was appointed as Taoiseach by President Seán T. O'Kelly.

18 February 1948; Nomination of John A. Costello (FG) as Taoiseach; Motion proposed by Richard Mulcahy and seconded by William Norton; Absolute majority: 74/147
Vote	Parties	Votes
Yes	Fine Gael (31), Labour Party (14), Clann na Poblachta (10), Clann na Talmhan (7), National Labour Party (5), Monetary Reform (1), Independents (7)	75 / 147
No	Fianna Fáil (66), Independents (2)	68 / 147
Absent or Not voting	Ceann Comhairle (1), Independents (2), Fianna Fáil (1)	4 / 147

== Members of the Government ==
The Ministers of the Government were proposed by the Taoiseach and approved by the Dáil. They were appointed by the president on the same day.

Office	Name	Term	Party
Taoiseach	John A. Costello	1948–1951	Fine Gael
Tánaiste	William Norton	1948–1951	Labour Party
Minister for Social Welfare	William Norton	1948–1951	Labour Party
Minister for Education	Richard Mulcahy	1948–1951	Fine Gael
Minister for External Affairs	Seán MacBride	1948–1951	Clann na Poblachta
Minister for Lands	Joseph Blowick	1948–1951	Clann na Talmhan
Minister for Posts and Telegraphs	James Everett	1948–1951	National Labour Party
Minister for Posts and Telegraphs	James Everett	1948–1951	Labour
Minister for Agriculture	James Dillon	1948–1951	Independent
Minister for Finance	Patrick McGilligan	1948–1951	Fine Gael
Minister for Justice	Seán Mac Eoin	1948–1951	Fine Gael
Minister for Defence	Thomas F. O'Higgins	1948–1951	Fine Gael
Minister for Industry and Commerce	Daniel Morrissey	1948–1951	Fine Gael
Minister for Local Government	Timothy J. Murphy	1948–1949	Labour
Minister for Health	Noël Browne	1948–1951	Clann na Poblachta
=== Change 3 May 1949 === Following the death of Timothy J. Murphy.
Office	Name	Term	Party
Minister for Local Government	William Norton	(acting)	Labour
=== Change 11 May 1949 === Following the death of Timothy J. Murphy.
Office	Name	Term	Party
Minister for Local Government	Michael Keyes	1949–1951	Labour
=== Changes 7 March 1951 === Cabinet reshuffle.
Office	Name	Term	Party
Minister for Justice	Daniel Morrissey	1951	Fine Gael
Minister for Industry and Commerce	Thomas F. O'Higgins	1951	Fine Gael
Minister for Defence	Seán Mac Eoin	1951	Fine Gael
=== Changes 12 April 1951 === Following the resignation of Noël Browne on 11 April 1951 due to controversy surrounding the Mother and Child Scheme.
Office	Name	Term	Party
Minister for Health	John A. Costello	(acting)	Fine Gael

== Parliamentary Secretaries ==
On 24 February 1948, the Government appointed the Parliamentary Secretaries on the nomination of the Taoiseach.

Name	Office	Party
Liam Cosgrave	Government Chief Whip	Fine Gael
Liam Cosgrave	Parliamentary Secretary to the Minister for Industry and Commerce	Fine Gael
Michael Donnellan	Parliamentary Secretary to the Minister for Finance	Clann na Talmhan
Brendan Corish	Parliamentary Secretary to the Minister for Local Government	Labour
Brendan Corish	Parliamentary Secretary to the Minister for Defence	Labour

== Republic of Ireland ==
The Republic of Ireland Act 1948 was enacted on 21 December 1948. It repealed the Executive Authority (External Relations) Act 1936, removing any remaining external function of the British monarchy in Ireland. It also declared that the description of the state was the Republic of Ireland. The Act came into operation on Easter Monday, 18 April 1949.
