= 1961 Irish general election =

Election to the 17th Dáil

- 4 October 1961

144 seats in Dáil Éireann (Note: Including Patrick Hogan (Lab), returned automatically for Clare as outgoing Ceann Comhairle, under Art. 16.6 of the Constitution and the Electoral (Chairman of Dáil Éireann) Act 1937.) 73 seats needed for a majority
- Turnout: 70.6% ▼0.7 pp
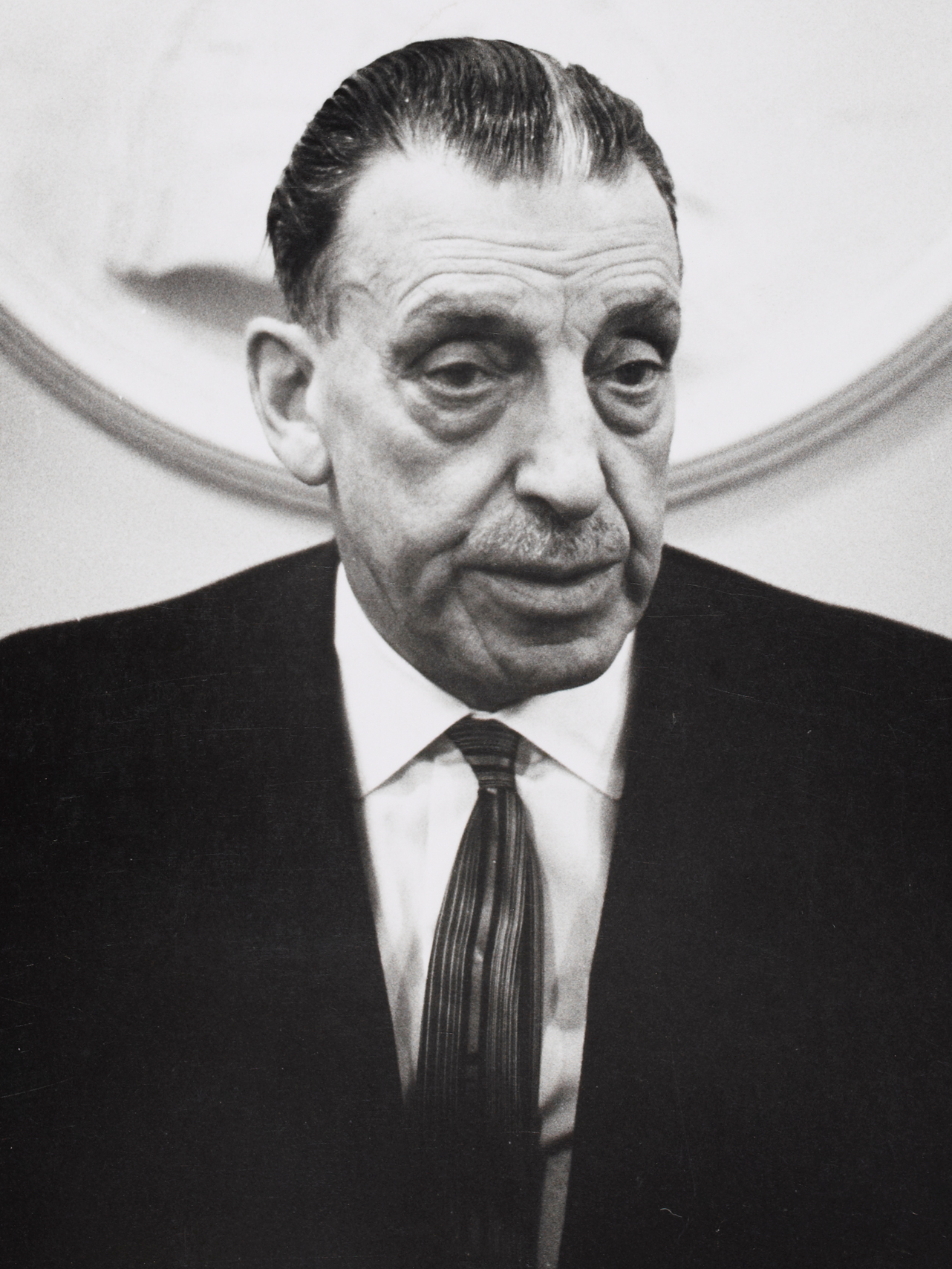

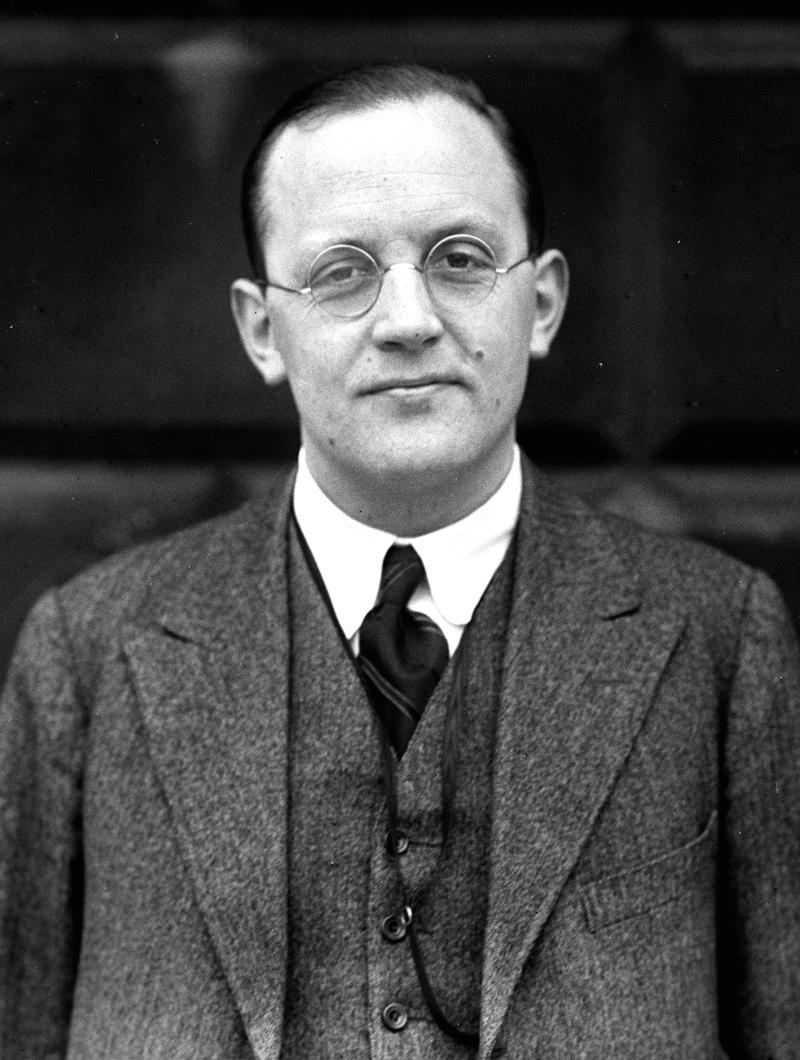

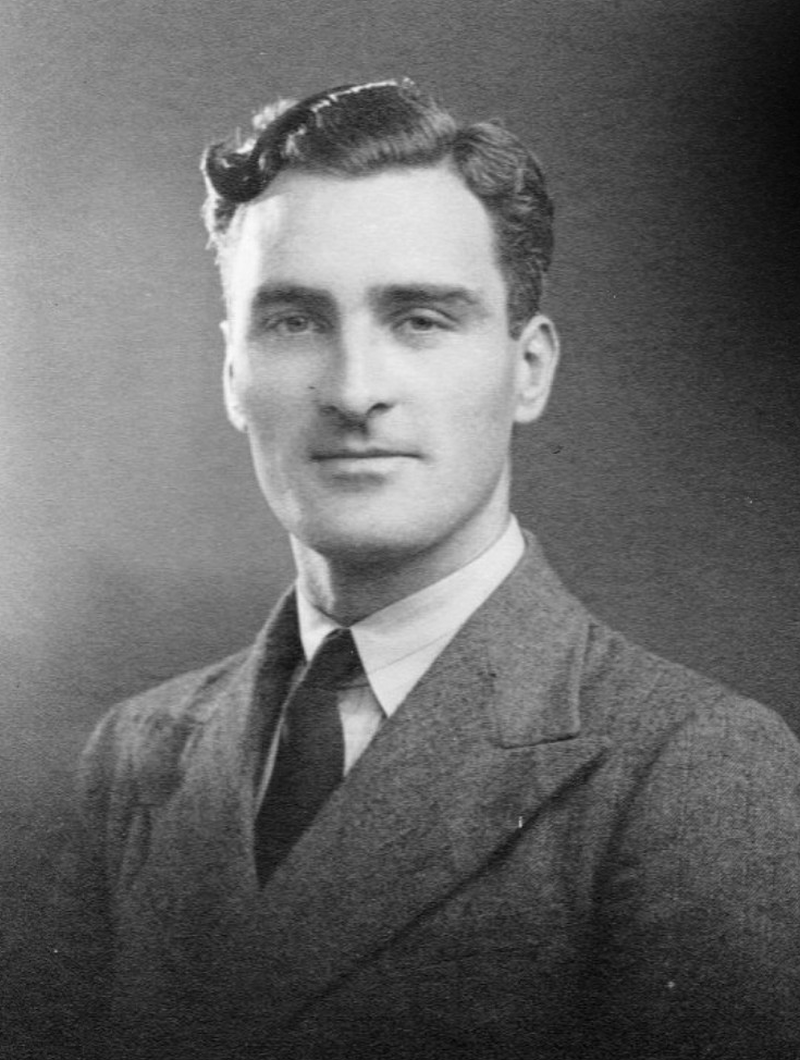

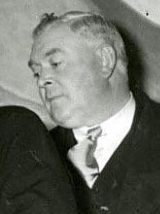

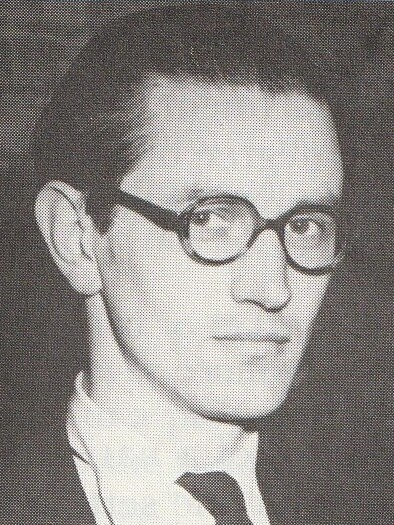

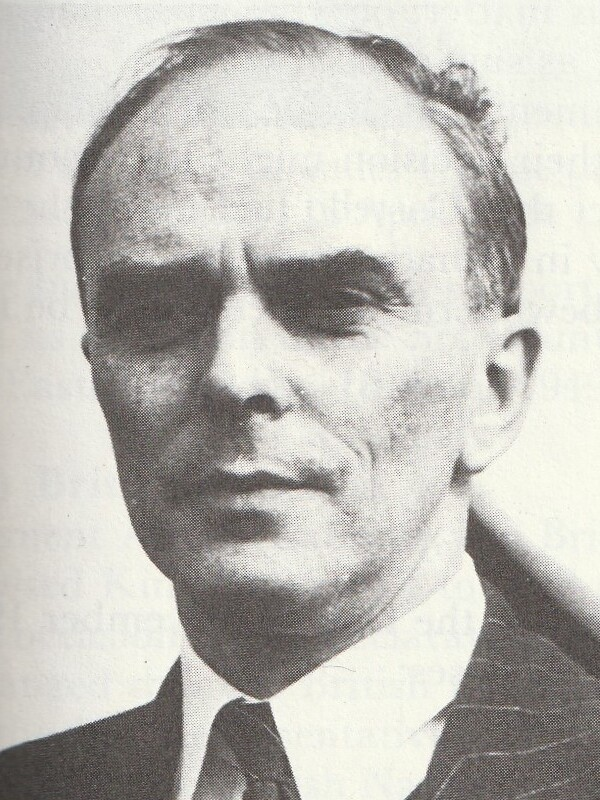
	First party	Second party	Third party
Leader	Seán Lemass	James Dillon	Brendan Corish
Party	Fianna Fáil	Fine Gael	Labour
Leader since	22 June 1959	21 March 1959	2 March 1960
Leader's seat	Dublin South-Central	Monaghan	Wexford
Last election	78 seats, 48.3%	40 seats, 26.6%	12 seats, 9.1%
Seats won	70	47	16
Seat change	▼8	▲7	▲4
Popular vote	512,073	374,099	136,111
Percentage	43.8%	32.0%	11.6%
Swing	▼4.5 pp	▲5.4 pp	▲2.5 pp
	Fourth party	Fifth party	Sixth party
Leader	Joseph Blowick	Noël Browne	Seán MacBride
Party	Clann na Talmhan	National Progressive Democrats	Clann na Poblachta
Leader since	5 September 1944	23 July 1958	21 January 1946
Leader's seat	Mayo South	Dublin South-East	Dublin South-West (defeated)
Last election	3 seats, 2.4%	New party	1 seat, 1.7%
Seats won	2	2	1
Seat change	▼1	▲2	0
Popular vote	17,693	11,490	13,170
Percentage	1.5%	1.0%	1.1%
Swing	▼0.9 pp	▲1.0 pp	▼0.6 pp
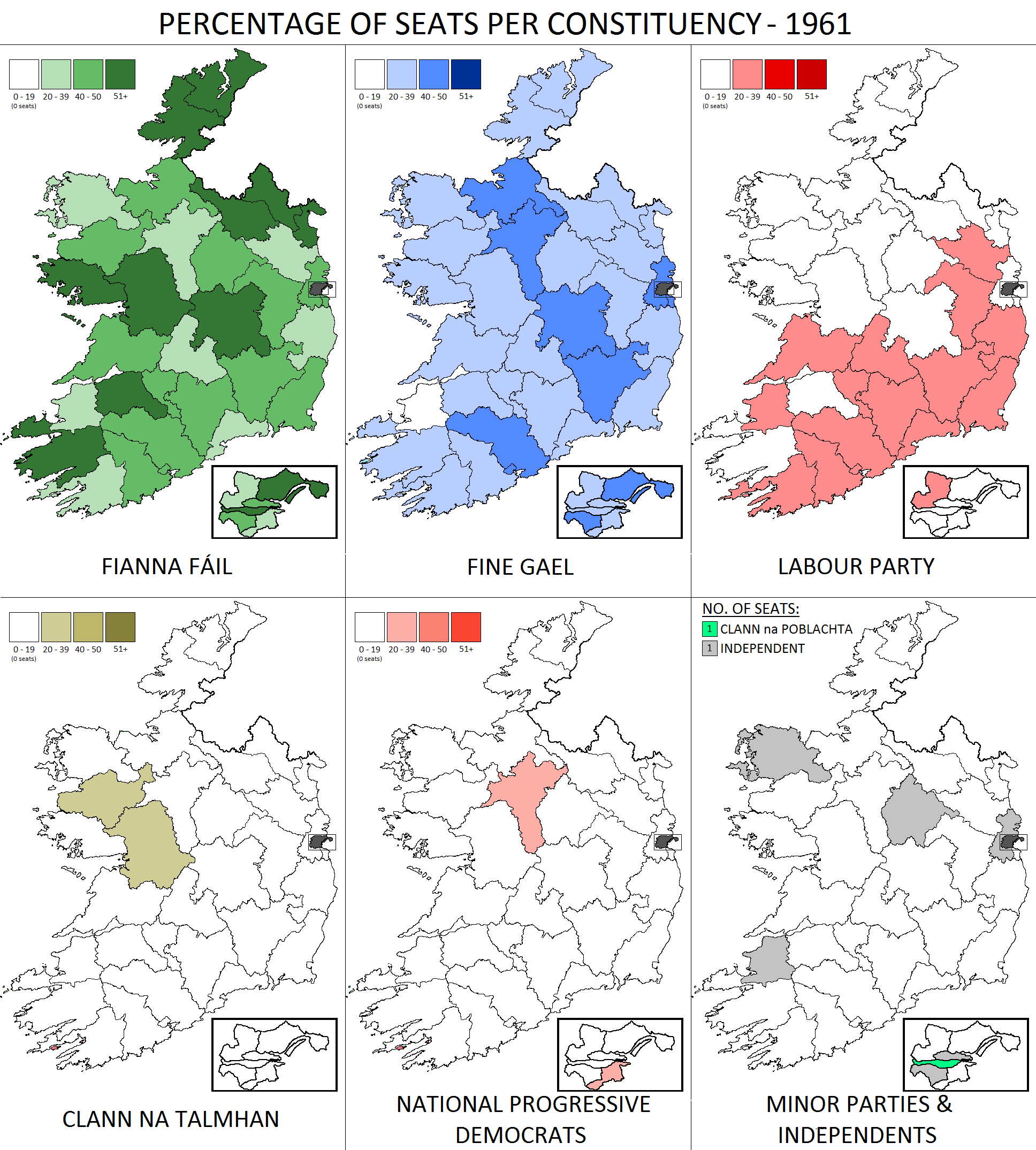
Taoiseach before election
Seán Lemass
Fianna Fáil
Taoiseach after election
Seán Lemass
Fianna Fáil

The 1961 Irish general election to the 17th Dáil was held on Wednesday, 4 October, following the dissolution of the 16th Dáil on 15 September by President Éamon de Valera on the request of Taoiseach Seán Lemass. The general election took place in 38 Dáil constituencies throughout Ireland for 144 seats in Dáil Éireann, the house of representatives of the Oireachtas, which had been reduced in size by three seats from the previous election by the Electoral (Amendment) Act 1961. Fianna Fáil lost its majority but remained the dominant party.

The 17th Dáil met at Leinster House on 11 October to nominate the Taoiseach for appointment by the president and to approve the appointment of a new government of Ireland. Lemass was re-appointed Taoiseach, forming the 10th government of Ireland, a single-party minority Fianna Fáil government.

== Campaign ==
At the general election of 1961, the three main parties were led by new leaders: Seán Lemass had taken charge of Fianna Fáil in 1959, making this the first time Fianna Fáil faced a general election campaign without Éamon de Valera (who had become President of Ireland in 1959). James Dillon had taken over at Fine Gael in 1959 also, while the Labour Party was now under the leadership of Brendan Corish.

Lemass announced the date of the election on 8 September, with the dissolution to take place a week later on 15 September. It was the shortest period between the dissolution and the election permitted in law.

While the election was caused by the "crisis" surrounding Ireland's application for membership of the European Economic Community and various other international affairs, little attention was paid to these matters during the campaign; the 1961 general election has become known as the dullest campaign on record, with the most important issue being the teaching of the Irish language in schools. Fianna Fáil fought the election on its record in government and a reforming theme; Fine Gael presented itself as the party of free enterprise. The Labour Party campaigned strongly against the "conservative" Fianna Fáil and Fine Gael parties. It also favoured major expansion in the public sector. It was the first and only general election contested by the National Progressive Democrats led by Noël Browne.

== Result ==
Election to the 17th Dáil – 4 October 1961
Party	Leader	Seats	±	% of seats	First pref. votes	% FPv	±%
Fianna Fáil	Seán Lemass	70	–8	48.6	512,073	43.8	–4.5
Fine Gael	James Dillon	47	+7	32.6	374,099	32.0	+5.4
Labour	Brendan Corish	16	+4	11.1	136,111	11.6	+2.5
Sinn Féin	Paddy McLogan	0	–4	0	36,396	3.1	–2.2
Clann na Talmhan	Joseph Blowick	2	–1	1.4	17,693	1.5	–0.9
Clann na Poblachta	Seán MacBride (Note: After the election, Seán MacBride continued as leader of Clann na Poblachta, while Joseph Barron became parliamentary leader and the sole member of the parliamentary party.)	1	0	0.7	13,170	1.1	–0.6
National Progressive Democrats	Noël Browne	2	New	1.4	11,490	1.0	–
Christian Democratic Party		0	New	0	1,132	0.1	–
Irish Workers' League	Michael O'Riordan	0	New	0	277	0.0	–
Independent	N/A	6	–3	4.2	65,963	5.6	–0.3
Spoilt votes					11,334	—N/a	—N/a
Total		144	–3	100	1,179,738	100	—N/a
Electorate/Turnout					1,670,860	70.6%	—N/a

=== Voting summary ===
First preference vote
Fianna Fáil	43.83%
Fine Gael	32.02%
Labour	11.65%
Sinn Féin	3.12%
Clann na Talmhan	1.51%
Clann na Poblachta	1.13%
National Progressive Democrats	0.98%
Others	0.12%
Independent	5.65%

=== Seats summary ===
Dáil seats
Fianna Fáil	48.61%
Fine Gael	32.64%
Labour	11.11%
Clann na Talmhan	1.39%
National Progressive Democrats	1.39%
Clann na Poblachta	0.69%
Independent	4.17%

== Government formation ==
The 17th Dáil met on 11 October 1961. Fianna Fáil were short of a majority, with 70 of the 144 seats in the Dáil, but were able to form a new single-party government, the 10th Government of Ireland, with the support of Independent TDs.

== Changes in membership ==
=== First-time TDs ===
- Lorcan Allen
- Mark Clinton
- George Colley
- Patrick Connor
- Paddy Harte
- Brian Lenihan
- Tom O'Donnell
- Séamus Pattison
- Eugene Timmons
- Seán Treacy

=== Re-elected TDs ===
- Seán Collins

=== Retiring TDs ===
- Patrick Giles
- Peadar Maher
- Richard Mulcahy
- Oscar Traynor

=== Defeated TDs ===
- Batt Donegan
- Gus Healy
- Denis Larkin
- Frank Loughman
- James O'Toole

== Seanad election ==
The Dáil election was followed by an election to the 10th Seanad.
