= Noël Browne =

Irish politician (1915–1997)

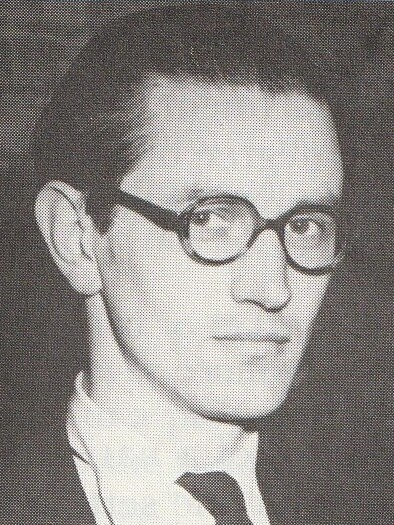
- Browne in 1948

Minister for Health
- In office 18 February 1948 – 11 April 1951
- Taoiseach: John A. Costello
- Preceded by: James Ryan
- Succeeded by: John A. Costello

Leader of the National Progressive Democrats
- In office 23 July 1958 – 4 April 1963
- Preceded by: New office
- Succeeded by: Office abolished

Teachta Dála
- In office June 1981 – February 1982
- Constituency: Dublin North-Central
- In office June 1977 – June 1981
- Constituency: Dublin Artane
- In office June 1969 – February 1973
- Constituency: Dublin South-East
- In office March 1957 – April 1965
- Constituency: Dublin South-East
- In office February 1948 – May 1954
- Constituency: Dublin South-East

Senator
- In office 1 June 1973 – 16 June 1977
- Constituency: Dublin University

Personal details
- Born: 20 December 1915 Waterford, Ireland
- Died: 21 May 1997 (aged 81) Baile na hAbhann, County Galway, Ireland
- Party: Independent (1951–1953, 1957–1958, 1977)
- Other political affiliations: Clann na Poblachta (1946–1951); Fianna Fáil (1953–1957); National Progressive Democrats (1958–1963); Labour (1963–1977); Socialist Labour (1977–1982)
- Spouse: Phyllis Harrison (m. 1944)
- Children: 2
- Education: Trinity College Dublin
- Profession: Medical doctor

Noël Christopher Browne (20 December 1915 – 21 May 1997) was an Irish medical doctor and politician who served as Minister for Health from 1948 to 1951 and Leader of the National Progressive Democrats from 1958 to 1963. He was a TD over four periods between 1948 and 1982, and held a Seanad seat for the Dublin University constituency from 1973 to 1977.

Having grown up in poverty, he qualified as a medical doctor in the 1940s. He entered politics to bring attention to tuberculosis, which had killed both his parents and most of his siblings. On his first day in Dáil Éireann in 1948, he was appointed Minister for Health. Browne is credited with waging a successful total war on tuberculosis, but his attempt to implement the Mother and Child Scheme led to his resignation from the government in 1951 and remains a highly controversial episode in Irish political history.

Browne was an outspoken and high-profile figure over more than three decades in the Oireachtas, representing five political parties, founding two, serving in both houses and losing his seat twice. During his time in politics he continued to work as a medical doctor, first in sanatoria and later as a psychiatrist.

Despite having a propensity for feuding and umbrage-taking, Browne is credited as having been a progressive force in Irish public life. He opposed corporal punishment and Apartheid in South Africa, and his advocacy of secularism, abortion rights and LGBT equality preceded these views becoming mainstream in Ireland.

== Early life ==
Noël Browne was born on 20 December 1915 at Bath Street in Waterford city. He was the fourth of eight children. His mother, Mary Therese Cooney, was from Hollymount, County Mayo, and his father, Joseph Browne, was an RIC sergeant from Loughrea, County Galway, who left the force in 1918 after an indifferent career. In his memoir, Browne recalls returning to the street of his birth as an adult without realising he was there. Only his wife Phyllis recognised it, but, observing its squalor, decided not to bring up his personal connection so as not to upset him.

As a young child, Browne moved to the Bogside in Derry city, where his father worked at a shirt factory to supplement his police pension. During his time in Derry, Browne developed persistent deafness in one ear as a result of a poorly treated bout of measles. The family then moved to Athlone, County Westmeath, where Browne's father took up work as an inspector with the Royal Society for the Protection of Children, a job which earned a significantly greater income.

Both of Browne's parents developed tuberculosis, probably due to squalid living conditions in Derry and his father's long hours of work. The disease devastated his family. Browne's father died from it in 1927, forcing the rest of the family to vacate his employer-owned home in Athlone. After a period with his mother's family in Mayo, they moved to Lambeth in London, because his dying mother feared her children would be placed in industrial schools if they stayed in Ireland. In London, Browne's mother died on 18 June 1929 from the disease. His brother Jody died from TB the following year. In total, all but one of Browne's siblings died from the disease, and Browne himself contracted it five times.

The Browne family lacked a permanent home in England, and often returned to Mayo. Eventually, thanks to the efforts of his sister Eileen, the siblings moved to Worthing in West Sussex. Eileen found work at a holiday home whose owner's sister happened to be the co-proprietor of St. Anthony's, an exclusive Catholic preparatory school in Eastbourne. As a result, Browne was able to gain admission there free of charge.

From there, he won a scholarship to Beaumont College, the Jesuit public school in Berkshire. At Beaumont, he played cricket and rugby, and deliberately failed the mandatory military training examinations twelve times. He also befriended Neville Chance, a wealthy boy, the son of a Dublin surgeon. This led to Browne being taken under the wing of the Chance family, who paid for his university education at Trinity College Dublin.

Browne moved to Dublin to study medicine in 1934. His time at Trinity was relatively carefree, and included boating trips to Nazi Germany and France on the eve of the Second World War. He drove a sports car and lived in a house on Merrion Square. At the Dublin University Boat Club, he met sixteen-year-old Phyllis Harrison, a Church of Ireland girl from Cabra, and they began a relationship. Browne completed his medical degree in 1940. He was regarded by contemporaries as an average student and someone with little respect for authority.

Before he graduated, however, he suffered a serious relapse of his tuberculosis. After a spell at Dr Steevens' Hospital in Dublin, the Chance family paid for him to be hospitalised at a sanatorium in England for two years. Experimental procedures he underwent during this period saved his life, but left him with only one functioning lung.

== Medical career and entry into politics ==
During the early 1940s, Browne took up medical internships at sanatoriums in Britain and Ireland, later saying his decision to conduct medical work in England was motivated by a desire to be part of the fight against fascism. In early 1944, he married Phyllis Harrison in a Catholic ceremony at Uxbridge in Middlesex. Two years later, he qualified as a medical doctor.

In late 1944, he moved back to Ireland to work at the Royal National Hospital for Consumption in Newcastle, County Wicklow. There, he befriended a TB patient and Irish Times journalist, Harry Kennedy. He and Kennedy spoke extensively about politics, society and ideas, and Browne credits Kennedy with helping form his political philosophy. Before his death from TB, Kennedy introduced Browne to Noel Hartnett, a barrister and political activist who had just left Fianna Fáil and was in the process of forming a new left-wing Republican party with his friend and mentor Seán MacBride.

Browne joined the party, Clann na Poblachta, with ambitions to make tuberculosis a national political issue. At this time, Ireland did not have a full-time Minister for Health, and efforts to combat failings in the health system were stymied by the Irish Red Cross, which was under the control of Archbishop John Charles McQuaid. In 1946, the antipathy of figures connected to the Irish Medical Association to Beveridge-style reforms proposed by Fianna Fáil's Conn Ward contributed to his departure from politics.

Clann na Poblachta won two by-elections in 1947, leading many to believe the party was en route to win the next general election and motivating Taoiseach Éamon de Valera to call an early election with a view to halting the new party's growth. While still serving as Assistant Hospital Superintendent at Newcastle, and now a father of two, Browne was selected as Clann na Poblachta candidate in Dublin South-East, a constituency which included senior politicians Seán MacEntee and John A. Costello. The mid-winter campaign was rancorous, featuring the use of Red Scare tactics by the Fianna Fáil government, and generated an unusually high level of international interest due to the possibility of a de Valera defeat.

Clann na Poblachta won only ten seats at the election, but, amid heavy losses for Fianna Fáil in Dublin, Browne won the last of the three seats in Dublin South-East, behind Costello and MacEntee.

== Minister for Health ==
Fianna Fáil had fallen well short of a majority at the election, and after sixteen years of uninterrupted rule, an unlikely coalition replaced them, comprising all five other parties: Fine Gael, the Labour Party, National Labour, Clann na Talmhan and Clann na Poblachta. It was Ireland's first coalition government. Due to his anti-tuberculosis campaigning, Browne was appointed Minister for Health on his first day in the Dáil. He was thirty-two years old.

Browne was now responsible for implementing the Health Act which had been passed by the previous government in 1947. As health minister, he controlled the funds generated by the Irish Hospitals' Sweepstake, comprising just over £10 million in 1948, and set about spending them on the eradication of TB. Browne quickly became a figure of national prominence. He was acutely aware that he could die young from tuberculosis and acted with energy and vigour. Browne's youth and inexperience, however, made him a target for attacks from the Fianna Fáil opposition, and his status as a Catholic who had attended Trinity College made him an object of suspicion to Archbishop McQuaid.

Healthcare in Ireland remained highly stratified in this period, between dispensaries caring for the very poor, and hospitals, dominated by consultants, which were controlled by voluntary bodies linked to the Catholic Church. Doctors and hospitals had enormous power and were highly suspicious of centralised state control. There were also tensions between the medical establishment, many with private educations and higher degrees, and the civil servants at the Department of Health, whom they tended to look down upon.

As health minister, Browne dramatically expanded the provision of hospitals and sanatoriums, created the National Blood Transfusion Association, and introduced free X-ray testing for TB. Along with the introduction of a new antibiotic, streptomycin, these measures contributed to a dramatic decline in TB fatality in Ireland. 1955 was the first year since the state was founded in which fewer than a thousand people died from the disease, and by 1960, the death rate for TB had fallen by more than eighty per cent from its peak.

Browne was an admirer of Britain's National Health Service and wished to expand access to healthcare in Ireland further. In 1950, he announced plans for a programme known as the Mother and Child Scheme, which would provide free state-funded healthcare to all mothers and children under the age of sixteen, with no means test. Doctors objected to the absence of a means test, as they were reliant on patient fees for their income.

The issue also became a battleground for a showdown between church and state. The Catholic hierarchy had forced the previous Fianna Fáil government to climb down on plans for free healthcare for mothers and children. It resumed its campaign against "socialised medicine", this time targeting Browne. The Bishop of Galway, Michael Browne, said the scheme was "based on the socialistic principle that children belonged to the State...and reminded one of the claims put forward by Hitler and Stalin". The hierarchy also expressed concern that doctors trained in non-Catholic institutions would provide gynaecological care without conforming to Catholic principles.

Months of attempted mediation between the government and the hierarchy proved fruitless. Perceived as aloof by his cabinet colleagues, Browne became politically isolated. In April 1951, Seán MacBride asked for Browne's resignation as Minister for Health. In his resignation speech to the Dáil, Browne said:

I had been led to believe that my insistence on the exclusion of a means test had the full support of my colleagues in the Government. I now know that it had not. Furthermore, the Hierarchy has informed the Government that they must regard the mother and child scheme proposed by me as opposed to Catholic social teaching. This decision I, as a Catholic, immediately accepted without hesitation.

He also complained that the Taoiseach, John A. Costello, had written a letter to the Bishop of Ferns describing the scheme as one "advocated by the Minister for Health", implying that the government as a whole did not support it. Following leaks by Browne, The Irish Times published private correspondence between the government and the bishops showing how the hierarchy had forced the Taoiseach's hand. The newspaper's editor R.M. Smyllie wrote that "the Roman Catholic Church would seem to be the effective Government of this country" and observed that the government's deference to the hierarchy gave the lie to their "pathetic appeals to the [Protestant] majority in the Six Counties to recognise that its advantage lies in a united Ireland".

== Parliamentary career ==
=== Fianna Fáil, the National Progressive Democrats and Labour ===
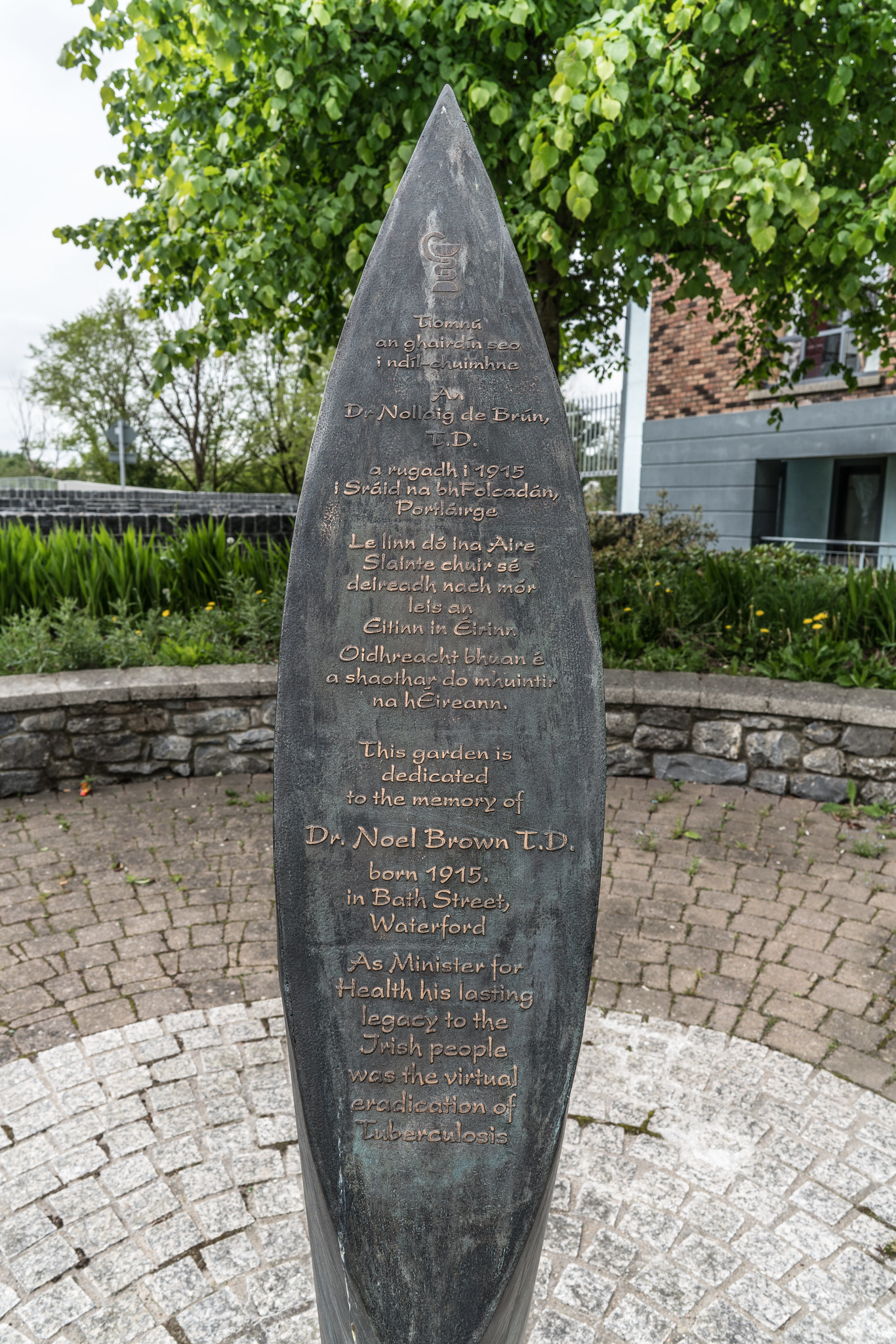
Monument to Browne in County Waterford

After his resignation as Minister for Health, Browne left Clann na Poblachta, but was re-elected to the Dáil as an independent TD for Dublin South-East at the 1951 election. He resumed work at Newcastle Sanatorium in 1952. Browne originally spoke little Irish, having been educated predominantly in England, but was fluent enough by 1953 to receive a Gold Fáinne from Gael Linn. After efforts by he and Michael ffrench-O'Carroll to form a new party were unsuccessful, Browne joined Fianna Fáil in October 1953. He was now a government backbencher, but he lost his seat at the 1954 election, largely due to the unpopularity of his running mate, Seán MacEntee, who had introduced a highly contentious Budget as Minister for Finance in 1952.

Out of elected office, Browne was a popular figure within Fianna Fáil, admired for his oratorical abilities. Seen as a threat to the party leadership, however, he was refused selection to stand for the party at the 1957 general election, and resigned from the organisation. At the election, he re-gained his Dáil seat in Dublin South-East as an independent.

In 1958, Browne and Jack McQuillan founded the National Progressive Democrats, a secular, left-wing party comprising many former members of Clann na Poblachta. The party was highly active in Dáil debates – to the point that the main opposition parties in the early 1960s, Fine Gael and Labour, changed the standing orders to thwart them – but failed to make electoral inroads. Browne held on to his seat at the 1961 general election, campaigning on the slogan Keep the Doctor in the House, but in 1963, he and McQuillan joined the Labour Party and disbanded their party. Browne's decision to join Labour was motivated by a bout of ill-health, concerns that the success of TB eradication would cost him his day job, and the recent retirement of a political nemesis in the party, William Norton.

Newcastle Sanatorium closed in early 1964, and he took up a new job in psychiatry at St. Brendan's Hospital in Grangegorman. Browne lost his seat at the 1965 general election in spite of a rise in the Labour vote nationally, and was unsuccessful in the subsequent Seanad election. The following year, Browne completed a diploma in Psychological Medicine at Trinity College. In 1966, Ivor Browne took over St. Brendan's, and he and Noël Browne had similar views regarding the need for reform of mental health. Ivor Browne gave Noël Browne a promotion which secured his financial situation following the loss of his TD's salary.

Again out of public office, he became a leading figure on the Labour Party's nascent young left. Browne was elected Vice President of the Labour Party in 1967. Following the death of James Everett, Browne sought the Labour nomination to contest a by-election in Wicklow, the area in which he lived, but was defeated by Liam Kavanagh. Browne became a figurehead for those within the party who were opposed to coalition unless Labour was the senior partner. Browne became a vocal opponent of Apartheid in South Africa: in 1970, he was among those who protested outside Thomond Park in Limerick and Lansdowne Road in Dublin when Ireland played the South African rugby team. Browne publicly called for a "progressively expanding boycott on the importation of South African produce, as advocated by the ANC".

In the lead-up to the 1969 general election, Labour offered a radically left-wing manifesto including nationalisation of banks and the offer of a wide range of free public services. A number of high-profile figures had joined the party as election candidates, including Justin Keating, David Thornley and Conor Cruise O'Brien. Browne re-gained his seat in Dublin South-East, though the expected national breakthrough did not materialise, and Fianna Fáil won an overall majority. Later that year, Browne suffered a minor heart attack, which contributed to his disillusionment with his work in mental health. He had spent years working in Ballymun, and believed government neglect was contributing to a crisis he could not solve through medical expertise alone. In 1970, he moved back to the former Newcastle Sanatorium, now a psychiatric facility, to work as a psychiatrist.

The outbreak of the Troubles drastically shifted the internal politics of the Labour Party. The party leader, Brendan Corish, believed the poor 1969 election performance, the growing mayhem in Northern Ireland and the Arms Crisis justified reversing the party's anti-coalition stance. This turned Browne into an implacable opponent of Corish's leadership. In 1971, Browne issued a speech attacking clerical celibacy which attracted opposition even from Labour's liberal wing. Corish distanced himself from the remarks, but in response Browne frequently brought up a previous statement Corish had made that he was "a Catholic first, an Irishman second and a socialist third". Browne said he viewed Salvador Allende as a model for introducing socialism by parliamentary means.

At the 1973 general election, Browne refused to sign the National Coalition's election pledges, which barred him from standing as a Labour candidate. Ruairi Quinn stood for Labour in Dublin South-East. With this, Browne believed his parliamentary career was at an end.

=== Seanad Éireann and Socialist Labour ===
Following the 1973 general election, Browne was persuaded by David Thornley and others to stand in the Dublin University Seanad constituency. He was nominated by, among others, John Armstrong, the Anglican Bishop of Cashel and Waterford. He was elected comfortably, finishing in second place on first preferences behind Mary Robinson. Though still formally a member of the Labour Party, he was denied access to meetings of the parliamentary party. This meant that Browne could speak at party events – at which he was intensely critical of the coalition government – but was not subject to a party whip in the Seanad, an arrangement which turned out to suit him.

In the Seanad, Browne spoke on a wide range of issues, mostly relating to the influence of the Catholic Church, including contraception and divorce. In 1974, Browne became the first member of the Oireachtas to call for the provision of therapeutic legal abortion, a claim later repeated by Leo Varadkar in 2021. During this period, he also came into conflict for the first time with Mary Robinson, whom he perceived to be excluding him from liberal legislative efforts. In 1976, he visited Amherst, Massachusetts for a conference on the conflict in Northern Ireland. In an article he wrote on his return, he praised Seamus Costello, the leader of the Irish Republican Socialist Party and the founder of the Irish National Liberation Army. This was a major shift for a figure previously known for his hostility to physical-force Republicanism and his association of it with militant Catholicism.

Browne decided to stand for the Dáil at the 1977 general election in Dublin Artane, on the city's northside, but was again denied permission to be a Labour candidate. He stood as an independent and was elected comfortably, outpolling the official Labour candidate by two-to-one. Later in 1977, his membership of Labour was terminated by the party, and, aged sixty-one, he decided to retire from medicine. He removed himself from the medical register in 1978.

In 1977, Browne became the first Dáil member to call for law reform in regard to homosexual acts, which were illegal at the time. His proposals were laughed at by others in the Dáil chamber at the time. In 1979, was one of the few Irish politicians to attend the opening of the Hirschfeld Centre, Dublin's first full-time LGBT community space.

Browne and his allies, including Matt Merrigan, formed the Socialist Labour Party in October 1977. He was its sole TD, though Browne did not wish to be its leader and the party permitted divisions over a number of policy issues, including Northern Ireland. At the 1981 general election, he was re-elected as a TD in the Dublin North-Central constituency. He voted for the January 1982 Budget introduced by John Bruton which proposed to add VAT to children's shoes. The Budget was defeated in the Dáil, which precipitated the collapse of Garret FitzGerald's coalition government. Browne decided to retire from the Dáil at the election that followed.

== Electoral results ==
Elections to the Dáil
Party	Election		FPv	FPv%	Result
Clann na Poblachta	Dublin South-East	1948	4,917	16.6	Elected on count 5/5
Independent	Dublin South-East	1951	8,473	28.9	Elected on count 1/3
Fianna Fáil	Dublin South-East	1954	5,489	20.5	Eliminated on count 4/4
Independent	Dublin South-East	1957	6,035	24.8	Elected on count 2/4
National Progressive Democrats	Dublin South-East	1961	4,717	19.1	Elected on count 4/4
Labour	Dublin South-East	1965	5,348	18.6	Eliminated on count 4/4
Labour	Dublin South-East	1969	5,724	21.4	Elected on count 7/7
Independent	Dublin Artane	1977	5,601	18.6	Elected on count 11/12
Socialist Labour	Dublin North-Central	1981	5,031	12.4	Elected on count 10/11

== Later life and death ==
Browne moved to Connemara after his retirement. He published a memoir, Against the Tide, in November 1986, and the book quickly became a bestseller. It eventually sold more than eighty thousand copies. The book's popularity was put down partly to its invocation of Browne's impoverished childhood and unlikely pursuit of politics, but also to its pitiless criticism of many Irish political figures. The book took four years to write, and Browne came into conflict with editors regularly. A friend, the Labour TD Michael D. Higgins, played a significant role in encouraging Browne to complete the project. Shortly after the book was published, Browne visited the Soviet Union for the first time.

Browne was considered a possible Labour Party candidate for the 1990 presidential election. Mary Robinson, party leader Dick Spring's first choice, had been reluctant to rejoin the party. Those around Spring were "appalled" at the idea of running Browne, believing he had "little or no respect for the party" and "was likely in any event to self-destruct as a candidate." Spring was determined to move quickly and got the Parliamentary Labour Party to endorse a proposal of having Robinson for consideration at its meeting on April 4. 22 days later, Browne's candidacy was defeated at a joint meeting of the PLP and Labour's Administrative Council on a reported margin of "at least 4:1." When Spring informed Browne by telephone that the party's Administrative Council had chosen Robinson over him, Browne hung up the telephone. Browne endorsed Austin Currie at the election.

Browne was highly critical of Mary Robinson after her election as president, calling the presidency an "impotent, titular post" and reacting to Robinson placing a symbolic lamp in the window of her official residence upon election (as a reminder of all of those forced to leave Ireland to seek work) in a letter to family by stating, "May one grieving Irish family, among those bidding farewell and those left behind, tell our roving president her fatuous, low-watt, low-powered, cheapest available, warmly welcoming electrical candle brought no comfort to our diaspora and could now, permanently, be switched off."

Browne died at Baile na hAbhann, County Galway on 21 May 1997, aged 81.

== Legacy ==
Few figures in 20th-century Ireland were as controversial as Noël Browne. On his death in 1997, The Independent said: "Admirers say his freshness to politics helped him break new ground. But fellow ministers reportedly found him petulant, unwilling to listen, and convinced he was always right. There was probably some truth in both." The newspaper noted that Browne's legacy was inextricably linked to the Mother and Child Scheme and his showdown with the Catholic hierarchy, and that the scars of the episode lingered in the Ireland of the 1990s. Bruce Arnold said: "He presided over events as a prophet might do, waiting for the fulfilment of a set of principled expectations which he had laid down."

Labour strategist Fergus Finlay said Browne had developed into a "bad tempered and curmudgeonly old man". Historian and political scientist Maurice Manning wrote that Browne "had the capacity to inspire fierce loyalty, but many of those who worked with and against him over the years found him difficult, self-centred, unwilling to accept the good faith of his opponents and often profoundly unfair in his intolerance of those who disagreed with him".

Nell McCafferty attended his funeral, writing for the Sunday Tribune:

Had there been more people around, we might have had a good row, accused each other of nefarious activities, but the fretful silence by the graveside of a political prince was suddenly, dauntingly appropriate. Noel Browne was gone with the soft wind that blew memories of him all over the land. The evening tide came in for him, at six minutes to seven, shortly after we had gone away.

In a 2010 RTÉ public poll, he finished in the top ten of Ireland's Greatest. In 2021, Tánaiste Leo Varadkar, also a medical doctor, gave a lecture on Browne to students of Trinity College Dublin, in which he summarised Browne's career. Varadkar noted Browne's cantankerous reputation but generally praised Browne, stating that Varadkar always "admired his idealism, his passion, and his determination to stand up for the causes and the people he believed in".

== Sources ==
- Noël Browne, Against the Tide, Gill & Macmillan, ISBN 0-7171-1458-9.
- Ruth Barrington, Health, Medicine and Politics in Ireland 1900-1970, Institute of Public Administration, 1987, ISBN 0-906980-72-0.
- Fergus Finlay, Snakes and Ladders, New Island Books, 1998, ISBN 1-874597-76-6.
- Kurt Jacobsen, "An Interview with Dr Noel Browne" in Maverick Voices: Conversations with Political and Cultural Rebels. Rowman & Littlefield, 2004. ISBN 978-0742533950
- Gabriel Kelly et al. (eds), Irish Social Policy in Context, UCD Press, 1999, ISBN 1-900621-25-8.
- Maurice Manning, James Dillon: A Biography, Wolfhound Press, 2000, ISBN 0-86327-823-X.
- Lorna Siggins, The Woman Who Took Power in the Park, Mainstream Publishing, 1997, ISBN 1-85158-805-1.
- John Horgan, Noël Browne: Passionate Outsider, Gill & Macmillan, 2000, ISBN 0-7171-2809-1.

Political offices
Preceded by James Ryan	Minister for Health; 1948–1951	Succeeded by John A. Costello (acting)
New title	Leader of National Progressive Democrats; 1958–1963	Succeeded by Merged with Labour Party

Dáil	Election	Deputy (Party)	Deputy (Party)	Deputy (Party)	Deputy (Party)
13th	1948	John A. Costello (FG)	Seán MacEntee (FF)	Noël Browne (CnaP)	3 seats 1948–1981
14th	1951	John A. Costello (FG)	Seán MacEntee (FF)	Noël Browne (Ind.)	3 seats 1948–1981
15th	1954	John A. Costello (FG)	Seán MacEntee (FF)	John O'Donovan (FG)	3 seats 1948–1981
16th	1957	John A. Costello (FG)	Seán MacEntee (FF)	Noël Browne (Ind.)	3 seats 1948–1981
17th	1961	John A. Costello (FG)	Seán MacEntee (FF)	Noël Browne (NPD)	3 seats 1948–1981
18th	1965	John A. Costello (FG)	Seán MacEntee (FF)	Seán Moore (FF)	3 seats 1948–1981
19th	1969	Garret FitzGerald (FG)	Noël Browne (Lab)	Seán Moore (FF)	3 seats 1948–1981
20th	1973	Garret FitzGerald (FG)	Fergus O'Brien (FG)	Seán Moore (FF)	3 seats 1948–1981
21st	1977	Garret FitzGerald (FG)	Ruairi Quinn (Lab)	Seán Moore (FF)	3 seats 1948–1981
22nd	1981	Garret FitzGerald (FG)	Gerard Brady (FF)	Seán Moore (FF)	Richie Ryan (FG)
23rd	1982 (Feb)	Garret FitzGerald (FG)	Gerard Brady (FF)	Ruairi Quinn (Lab)	Alexis FitzGerald Jnr (FG)
24th	1982 (Nov)	Garret FitzGerald (FG)	Gerard Brady (FF)	Ruairi Quinn (Lab)	Joe Doyle (FG)
25th	1987	Garret FitzGerald (FG)	Gerard Brady (FF)	Ruairi Quinn (Lab)	Michael McDowell (PDs)
26th	1989	Garret FitzGerald (FG)	Gerard Brady (FF)	Ruairi Quinn (Lab)	Joe Doyle (FG)
27th	1992	Frances Fitzgerald (FG)	Eoin Ryan Jnr (FF)	Ruairi Quinn (Lab)	Michael McDowell (PDs)
28th	1997	Frances Fitzgerald (FG)	Eoin Ryan Jnr (FF)	Ruairi Quinn (Lab)	John Gormley (GP)
29th	2002	Michael McDowell (PDs)	Eoin Ryan Jnr (FF)	Ruairi Quinn (Lab)	John Gormley (GP)
30th	2007	Lucinda Creighton (FG)	Chris Andrews (FF)	Ruairi Quinn (Lab)	John Gormley (GP)
31st	2011	Lucinda Creighton (FG)	Eoghan Murphy (FG)	Ruairi Quinn (Lab)	Kevin Humphreys (Lab)
32nd	2016	Constituency abolished. See Dublin Bay South.			

Dáil	Election	Deputy (Party)	Deputy (Party)	Deputy (Party)
21st	1977	Charles Haughey (FF)	Timothy Killeen (FF)	Noël Browne (Ind.)
22nd	1981	Constituency abolished		

Dáil	Election	Deputy (Party)	Deputy (Party)	Deputy (Party)	Deputy (Party)
13th	1948	Vivion de Valera (FF)	Martin O'Sullivan (Lab)	Patrick McGilligan (FG)	3 seats 1948–1961
14th	1951	Vivion de Valera (FF)	Colm Gallagher (FF)	Patrick McGilligan (FG)	3 seats 1948–1961
15th	1954	Vivion de Valera (FF)	Maureen O'Carroll (Lab)	Patrick McGilligan (FG)	3 seats 1948–1961
16th	1957	Vivion de Valera (FF)	Colm Gallagher (FF)	Patrick McGilligan (FG)	3 seats 1948–1961
16th	1957 by-election	Vivion de Valera (FF)	Frank Sherwin (Ind.)	Patrick McGilligan (FG)	3 seats 1948–1961
17th	1961	Vivion de Valera (FF)	Frank Sherwin (Ind.)	Patrick McGilligan (FG)	Celia Lynch (FF)
18th	1965	Vivion de Valera (FF)	Michael O'Leary (Lab)	Luke Belton (FG)	Celia Lynch (FF)
19th	1969	George Colley (FF)	Michael O'Leary (Lab)	Luke Belton (FG)	Celia Lynch (FF)
20th	1973	George Colley (FF)	Michael O'Leary (Lab)	Luke Belton (FG)	Celia Lynch (FF)
21st	1977	Vincent Brady (FF)	Michael O'Leary (Lab)	Michael Keating (FG)	3 seats 1977–1981
22nd	1981	Vincent Brady (FF)	Charles Haughey (FF)	Noël Browne (SLP)	George Birmingham (FG)
23rd	1982 (Feb)	Vincent Brady (FF)	Charles Haughey (FF)	Richard Bruton (FG)	George Birmingham (FG)
24th	1982 (Nov)	Vincent Brady (FF)	Charles Haughey (FF)	Richard Bruton (FG)	George Birmingham (FG)
25th	1987	Vincent Brady (FF)	Charles Haughey (FF)	Richard Bruton (FG)	George Birmingham (FG)
26th	1989	Vincent Brady (FF)	Charles Haughey (FF)	Richard Bruton (FG)	Ivor Callely (FF)
27th	1992	Seán Haughey (FF)	Derek McDowell (Lab)	Richard Bruton (FG)	Ivor Callely (FF)
28th	1997	Seán Haughey (FF)	Derek McDowell (Lab)	Richard Bruton (FG)	Ivor Callely (FF)
29th	2002	Seán Haughey (FF)	Finian McGrath (Ind.)	Richard Bruton (FG)	Ivor Callely (FF)
30th	2007	Seán Haughey (FF)	Finian McGrath (Ind.)	Richard Bruton (FG)	3 seats from 2007
31st	2011	Aodhán Ó Ríordáin (Lab)	Finian McGrath (Ind.)	Richard Bruton (FG)	3 seats from 2007
32nd	2016	Constituency abolished. See Dublin Bay North			
