= Minister for Health (Ireland) =

Irish government cabinet minister

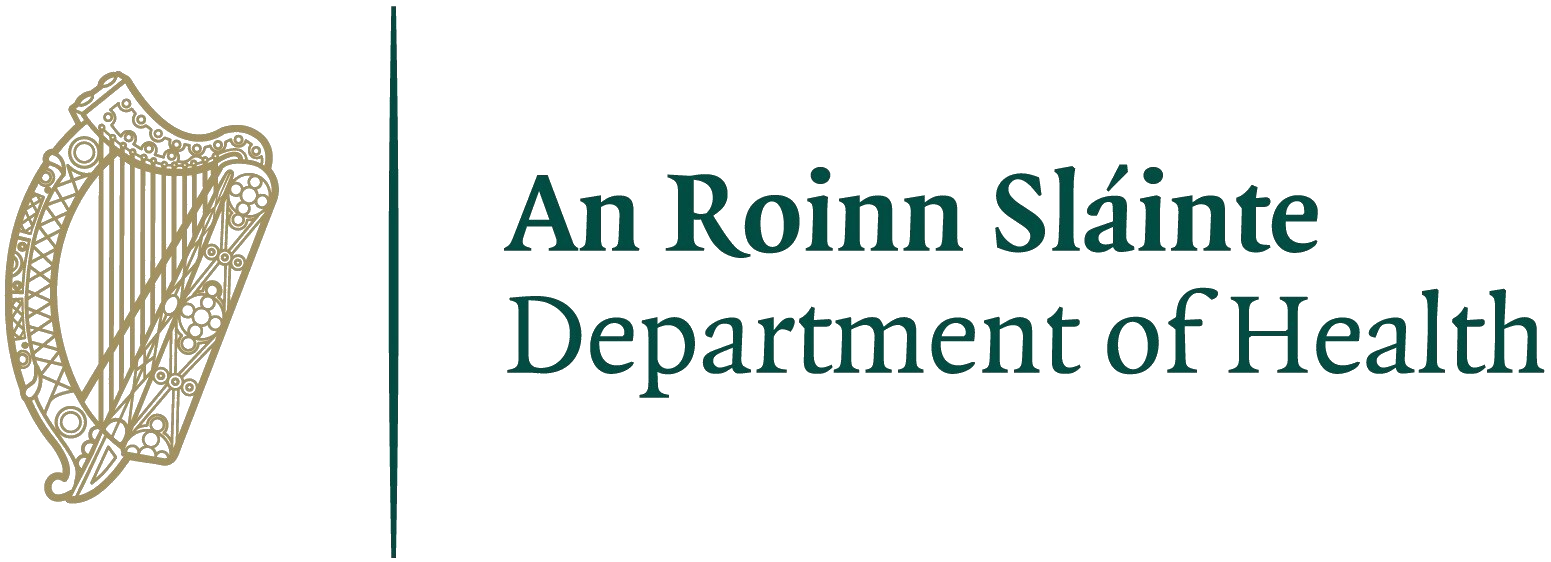

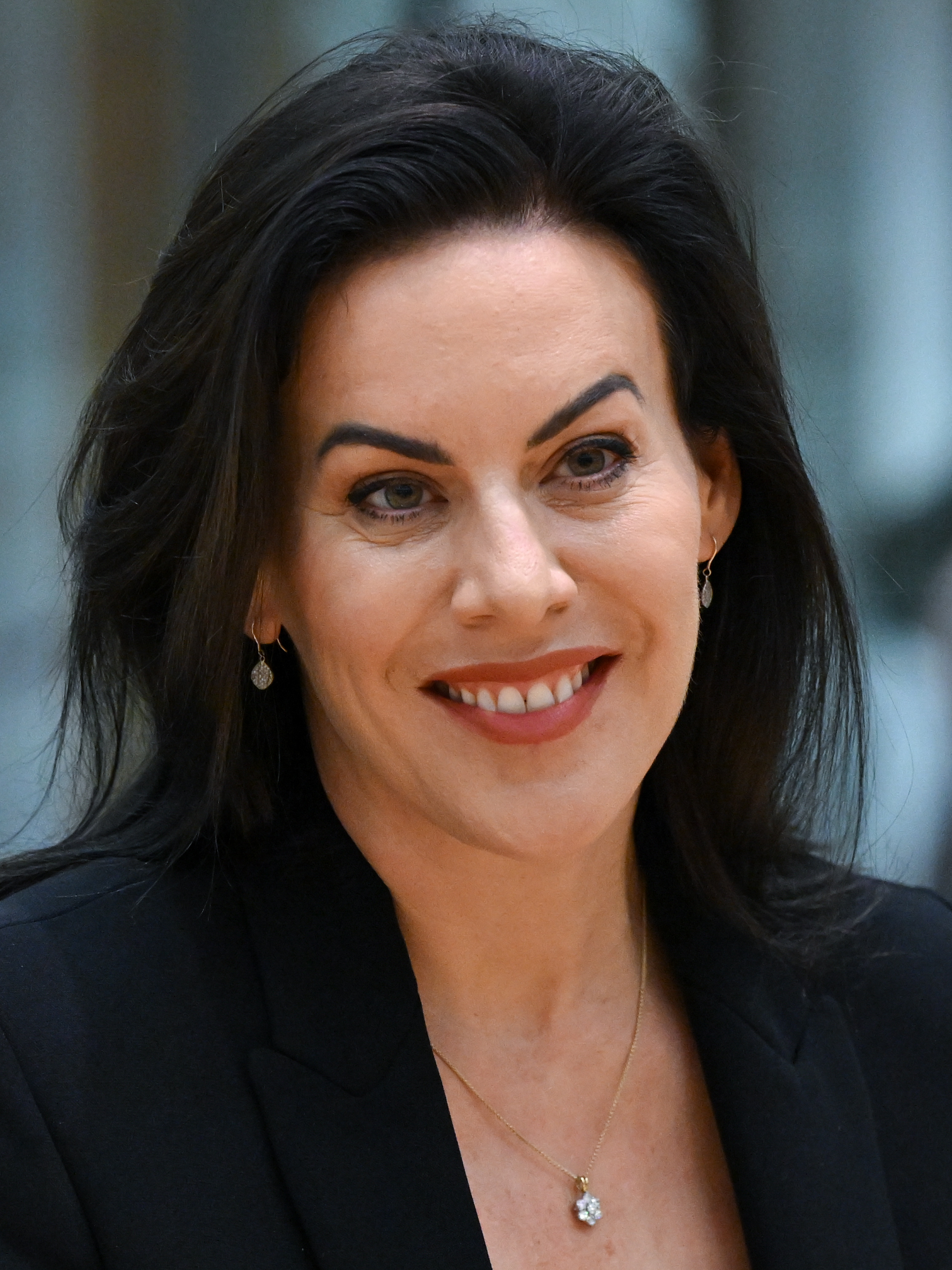
- Incumbent; Jennifer Carroll MacNeill since 23 January 2025
- Department of Health
- Type: Health minister
- Status: Cabinet minister
- Member of: Government of Ireland; Council of the European Union; North/South Ministerial Council; Dáil Éireann
- Reports to: Taoiseach
- Seat: Dublin, Ireland
- Nominator: Taoiseach
- Appointer: President of Ireland (on the advice of the Taoiseach)
- Inaugural holder: James Ryan
- Formation: 22 January 1947
- Salary: €210,750 (2025) (including €115,953 TD salary)
- Website: Official website

The minister for health (Irish: An tAire Sláinte) is a senior minister in the Government of Ireland and leads the Department of Health. The minister for health is responsible for healthcare in Ireland and related services.

The current minister for health is Jennifer Carroll MacNeill, TD. She is assisted by:

- Mary Butler, TD – Minister of State for mental health
- Jennifer Murnane O'Connor, TD – Minister of State for public health, well-being and drugs; and
- Kieran O'Donnell, TD – Minister of State for older people

== History ==
Health care formed part of the portfolio of the minister for local government and public health until 22 January 1947. On that date, the new position of Minister for Health was created, with control of policy regarding health care provision in Ireland. In the past, it was common for the minister to also hold the position of Minister for Social Welfare.

In recent years, and especially since the tenure of Michael Noonan in 1994–1997, being appointed as minister has become somewhat of a "poisoned chalice" in government circles and a portfolio to be avoided by aspiring politicians, during his tenure Brian Cowen referred to the Department of Health as Angola because there were landmines everywhere. A number of scandals, mostly due to medical negligence, have meant that the minister immediately becomes identified with the scandal. For instance, the Hepatitis C scandal, the withholding of baby organs without parental consent or knowledge, the Michael Neary saga in Drogheda and other high-profile medical scandals have dogged the minister and department. Additionally the minister has to deal with logistic issues not seen in other departments such as strikes, shortages and queues which are all too familiar in clinics and hospitals around the country.

== Overview ==
The minister's duties include the creation and assessment of policy for health services. The main policy sections of the department, together with their responsibilities, are:

=== Continuing Care ===
- Services for homeless adults
- Services for people with disabilities
- Services for the elderly and palliative care

=== Finance ===
- Health insurance
- Hospital planning
- Public-Private Partnerships

=== Personnel Management and Development ===
- Nursing policy
- Personnel management and development

=== Primary Care ===
- Community health (child health, dental services, AIDS, reproductive health)
- General medical services

=== Secondary Care ===
- Blood policy
- Hospital services

=== Strategic Policy and Corporate Services ===
- Corporate Services
- Health promotion
- Health Strategy Legislation

== List of office-holders ==
Denotes acting Minister

=== Minister for Health 1947–1997 ===
Name	Term of office		Party	Government(s)
James Ryan (1st time) (Note: Also Minister for Social Welfare.)	22 January 1947	18 February 1948	Fianna Fáil	4th
Noël Browne	18 February 1948	11 April 1951	Clann na Poblachta	5th
John A. Costello (acting)	12 April 1951	13 June 1951	Fine Gael	5th
James Ryan (2nd time)	13 June 1951	2 June 1954	Fianna Fáil	6th
Tom O'Higgins	2 June 1954	20 March 1957	Fine Gael	7th
Seán MacEntee	20 March 1957	21 April 1965	Fianna Fáil	8th • 9th • 10th
Donogh O'Malley	21 April 1965	13 July 1966	Fianna Fáil	11th
Seán Flanagan	13 July 1966	2 July 1969	Fianna Fáil	12th
Erskine H. Childers	2 July 1969	14 March 1973	Fianna Fáil	13th
Brendan Corish	14 March 1973	5 July 1977	Labour	14th
Charles Haughey	5 July 1977	11 December 1979	Fianna Fáil	15th
Michael Woods (1st time)	12 December 1979	30 June 1981	Fianna Fáil	16th
Eileen Desmond	30 June 1981	9 March 1982	Labour	17th
Michael Woods (2nd time)	9 March 1982	14 December 1982	Fianna Fáil	18th
Barry Desmond	14 December 1982	20 January 1987	Labour	19th
John Boland (Note: Also Minister for the Environment.)	20 January 1987	10 March 1987	Fine Gael	19th
Rory O'Hanlon	10 March 1987	14 November 1991	Fianna Fáil	20th • 21st
Mary O'Rourke	14 November 1991	11 February 1992	Fianna Fáil	21st
John O'Connell	11 February 1992	12 January 1993	Fianna Fáil	22nd
Brendan Howlin	12 January 1993	17 November 1994	Labour	23rd
Michael Woods (3rd time)	17 November 1994	15 December 1994	Fianna Fáil	23rd
Michael Noonan	15 December 1994	26 June 1997	Fine Gael	24th
=== Minister for Health and Children 1997–2011 ===
Name	Term of office		Party	Government(s)
Brian Cowen	26 June 1997	27 January 2000	Fianna Fáil	25th
Micheál Martin	27 January 2000	29 September 2004	Fianna Fáil	25th • 26th
Mary Harney	29 September 2004	19 January 2011	PD / Ind (Note: Harney was an Independent member of the government from the disbandment of the Progressive Democrats on 20 November 2009.)	26th • 27th • 28th
Mary Coughlan (Note: Also Minister for Education and Skills.)	20 January 2011	9 March 2011	Fianna Fáil	28th
=== Minister for Health 2011–present ===
Name	Term of office		Party	Government(s)
James Reilly	9 March 2011	11 July 2014	Fine Gael	29th
Leo Varadkar	11 July 2014	6 May 2016	Fine Gael	29th
Simon Harris	6 May 2016	27 June 2020	Fine Gael	30th • 31st
Stephen Donnelly	27 June 2020	23 January 2025	Fianna Fáil	32nd • 33rd • 34th
Jennifer Carroll MacNeill	23 January 2025	Incumbent	Fine Gael	35th
