= 1985 Dublin Corporation election =

Part of the 1985 Irish local elections

- 20 June 1985

All 52 seats on Dublin City Council
	First party	Second party	Third party
Party	Fianna Fáil	Fine Gael	Workers' Party
Seats won	26	13	6
Seat change	0	0
	Fourth party	Fifth party	Sixth party
Party	Labour	Sinn Féin	Independent
Seats won	2	1	4
Seat change		-
- Map showing the area of Dublin City Council
Council control after election
Fianna Fáil
Workers' Party

An election to Dublin City Council took place on 20 June 1985 as part of that year's Irish local elections. 52 councillors were elected from twelve local electoral areas (LEAs) for a five-year term of office on the electoral system of proportional representation by means of the single transferable vote (PR-STV). This term was extended for a further year, to 1991.

== Results by party ==
Party	Seats	±	First Pref. votes	FPv%	±%
Fianna Fáil	26		69,092	41.82	
Fine Gael	13		33,079	20.02	
Workers' Party	6		15,479	9.37	
Labour	2		14,825	8.97	
Sinn Féin	1		7,801	4.72	
Green	0		2,747	1.66	
Democratic Socialist	0		1,782	1.08	
Communist	0		388	0.23	
Independent	4		20,013	12.11	
Totals	52	-	165,206	100.00	—

== Results by local electoral area ==
=== Artane ===
Artane: 4 seats
Party	Candidate	FPv%	Count												
Party	Candidate	FPv%	1	2	3	4	5	6	7	8	9	10	11	12	13
Fianna Fáil	Seán Haughey		3,956												
Labour	Michael O'Halloran*		1,803	1,856	1,859	1,875	1,885	1,949	1,977	2,322	2,436	2,635	2,738		
Workers' Party	Pat McCartan		1,399	1,439	1,448	1,455	1,474	1,477	1,507	1,530	1,717	1,840	2,138	2,167	2,406
Fianna Fáil	Joan Jones		1,116	1,534	1,535	1,545	1,552	1,561	1,570	1,598	1,662	1,750	1,898	1,903	2,009
Sinn Féin	Terry Hughes		890	928	929	929	940	943	950	957	1,020	1,060			
Fianna Fáil	Ita Green*		806	1,442	1,447	1,450	1,453	1,462	1,490	1,551	1,607	1,782	1,915	1,920	2,146
Fine Gael	Richard Bruton TD		784	807	813	831	834	946	978	1,039	1,088	1,282	1,298	1,312	
Independent	Hannah Barlow Community*		674	698	708	709	721	724	861	921	983				
Labour	Paddy Bourke		575	590	592	595	599	606	616						
Democratic Socialist	Philip O'Connor		566	597	603	607	613	614	634	643					
Independent	William Austin McCoy Community		279	285	297	297	322	326							
Fine Gael	Noel Rice		192	196	196	223	223								
Independent	Fergal Thomas Goulding		100	103	107	108									
Fine Gael	Bill Mynes		87	91	91										
Green Alliance	Nora Keane		58	61											
Electorate: 25,974 Valid: 13,285 (51.76%) Spoilt: 160 Quota: 2,658 Turnout: 13,445

=== Ballyfermot ===
Ballyfermot: 4 seats
Party	Candidate	FPv%	Count												
Party	Candidate	FPv%	1	2	3	4	5	6	7	8	9	10	11	12	13
Workers' Party	Tomás MacGiolla TD*		1,670	1,675	1,706	1,737	1,774	2,224	2,318	2,522					
Fianna Fáil	Olga Bennett		1,236	1,238	1,239	1,269	1,324	1,330	1,426	1,452	1,729	1,844	1,848	1,929	2,420
Fianna Fáil	Pat McEntee*		1,125	1,128	1,141	1,154	1,174	1,181	1,197	1,237	1,388	1,522	1,530	1,568	
Fianna Fáil	Michael Delaney		1,098	1,099	1,106	1,111	1,132	1,136	1,149	1,174	1,427	1,554	1,560	1,579	2,257
Fine Gael	Charlie McManus*		1,060	1,060	1,066	1,086	1,114	1,121	1,144	1,241	1,267	1,319	1,335	2,202	2,286
Sinn Féin	Jimmy Delaney		1,019	1,021	1,041	1,056	1,069	1,080	1,095	1,125	1,171				
Democratic Socialist	Michael Conaghan		1,012	1,019	1,027	1,063	1,140	1,149	1,244	1,291	1,333	1,522	1,535	1,622	1,660
Fine Gael	Greg Walsh		944	948	949	977	1,028	1,031	1,132	1,221	1,247	1,275	1,283		
Fianna Fáil	John Doran		783	784	785	796	810	819	848	871					
Labour	Paddy O'Mahony*		496	497	501	509	637	640	667						
Workers' Party	Gerard Lynch		482	488	497	507	529								
Labour	George Butler		478	481	488	506									
Independent	Brian Patrick McMenamy		468	482	484	539	562	571							
Independent	Mich O'Mahony		282	286	289										
Communist	John Montgomery		118	120											
Green Alliance	Jan Loughney		61												
Electorate: 28,903 Valid: 12,332 (43.52%) Spoilt: 246 Quota: 2,467 Turnout: 12,578

=== Cabra ===
Cabra: 3 seats
Party	Candidate	FPv%	Count										
Party	Candidate	FPv%	1	2	3	4	5	6	7	8	9	10	11
Fianna Fáil	Patrick J. Farry		2,103	2,116	2,125	2,132	2,146	2,180	2,279	2,304	2,494	3,033	
Fianna Fáil	Dermot Fitzpatrick*		1,607	1,613	1,626	1,645	1,654	1,682	1,715	1,744	1,866	2,621	2,713
Fianna Fáil	Tom Leonard TD*		1,356	1,363	1,369	1,371	1,379	1,402	1,437	1,455	1,569		
Fine Gael	Tony Collis		1,347	1,363	1,382	1,398	1,473	1,507	1,594	2,519	2,607	2,671	2,674
Independent	Christy Sherwin*		1,346	1,370	1,415	1,439	1,528	1,659	2,021	2,056	2,525	2,654	2,659
Sinn Féin	Tony O'Flaherty		1,097	1,117	1,126	1,131	1,147	1,274	1,398	1,406			
Fine Gael	John Colgan		898	922	934	941	1,008	1,034	1,066				
Independent	Seán Coultry		636	675	695	710	743	843					
Workers' Party	Imelda Dixon		452	462	490	501	584						
Labour	Martin Giblin		264	270	289	438							
Labour	Jimmy Kelly		235	245	258								
Green Alliance	Brian Torode		199	204									
Independent	Michael Berney		190										
Electorate: 25,834 Valid: 11,730 (46.12%) Spoilt: 184 Quota: 2,933 Turnout: 11,914

=== Clontarf ===
Clontarf: 5 seats
Party	Candidate	FPv%	Count								
Party	Candidate	FPv%	1	2	3	4	5	6	7	8	9
Fianna Fáil	Vincent Brady TD*		4,676								
Independent	Seán D. Dublin Bay Rockall Loftus*		3,200								
Fine Gael	Pat Lee		1,870	1,907	1,942	1,972	2,007	2,114	2,235	2,799	2,803
Fianna Fáil	Eugene Timmons*		1,721	2,129	2,162	2,181	2,202	2,296	2,397	2,465	2,511
Fine Gael	Tom Farrell		1,580	1,610	1,639	1,664	1,695	1,805	1,918	2,553	2,566
Fianna Fáil	Joseph Burke		1,443	2,638	2,678	2,705	2,743	2,820	2,998		
Fine Gael	Cathy Fay		1,028	1,047	1,085	1,125	1,177	1,278	1,411		
Workers' Party	Triona Dooney		803	818	845	875	1,004	1,225			
Labour	Derek McDowell		583	601	613	795	846				
Labour	Jo (Josephine) Walsh		355	363	374						
Green Alliance	William Hughes Cooke		346	357	397	409					
Electorate: 39,304 Valid: 17,605 (45.47%) Spoilt: 257 Quota: 2,935 Turnout: 17,862

=== Crumlin ===
Crumlin: 4 seats
Party	Candidate	FPv%	Count									
Party	Candidate	FPv%	1	2	3	4	5	6	7	8	9	10
Fine Gael	Gay Mitchell TD*		2,962									
Fianna Fáil	Ben Briscoe TD*		2,598	2,617	2,623	2,630	2,790					
Workers' Party	Eric Byrne		1,536	1,547	1,574	1,623	1,644	1,647	1,736	2,026	2,214	2,384
Fianna Fáil	Andrew J. Callaghan		1,421	1,427	1,431	1,444	1,624	1,685	1,752	1,849	1,930	2,837
Fianna Fáil	Adele Ramsey		1,089	1,100	1,103	1,107	1,247	1,270	1,327	1,437	1,495	
Labour	Joe Connolly*		1,052	1,063	1,080	1,085	1,096	1,097	1,232	1,265	1,927	2,051
Labour	Michael Collins*		818	834	847	858	910	912	1,089	1,151		
Sinn Féin	Micheal Mac Conmara		714	717	726	762	770	770	774			
Fianna Fáil	Peter Meade		583	587	589	591						
Fine Gael	Colm Brangan		474	654	672	672	679	680				
Communist	Brian Joseph Buggle		124	125	134							
Green Alliance	Elma Holohan		122	123								
Electorate: 31,494 Valid: 13,493 (43.59%) Spoilt: 235 Quota: 2,699 Turnout: 13,728

=== Donaghmede ===
Donaghmede: 5 seats
Party	Candidate	FPv%	Count												
Party	Candidate	FPv%	1	2	3	4	5	6	7	8	9	10	11	12	13
Fianna Fáil	Ned Brennan*		3,513												
Fianna Fáil	Liam Fitzgerald TD*		3,306												
Fianna Fáil	Ivor Callely		1,401	1,841	2,096	2,113	2,120	2,137	2,149	2,191	2,889				
Labour	Seán Kenny*		1,317	1,346	1,382	1,390	1,395	1,400	1,436	1,476	1,518	1,533	2,163	2,509	2,741
Fine Gael	Maurice Manning TD		1,069	1,086	1,098	1,109	1,114	1,127	1,264	1,289	1,329	1,344	1,419	1,467	2,416
Workers' Party	Caitríona Ní Chuinneageáin		1,006	1,020	1,028	1,037	1,053	1,083	1,087	1,142	1,177	1,193	1,256		
Independent	Angela Mulligan		999	1,018	1,036	1,064	1,079	1,140	1,177	1,411	1,476	1,518	1,652	2,122	2,226
Fine Gael	Anto Kerins		970	982	994	997	1,001	1,012	1,252	1,279	1,300	1,310	1,375	1,408	
Labour	Tom Brennan*		902	937	968	970	974	981	1,022	1,124	1,162	1,181			
Fianna Fáil	Brian Monaghan		762	908	1,045	1,050	1,053	1,057	1,064	1,086					
Fine Gael	Margaret Hopkins		512	521	528	529	530	541							
Independent	John Meaney		472	481	493	504	535	585	602						
Green Alliance	Hilary McLoughlin		193	196	198	200	222								
Independent	Barry McGuirk		106	111	114	115									
Independent	Donal O hUadhaigh		100	103	104										
Electorate: 35,378 Valid: 16,628 (47.55%) Spoilt: 146 Quota: 2,772 Turnout: 16,824

=== Drumcondra ===
Drumcondra: 5 seats
Party	Candidate	FPv%	Count														
Party	Candidate	FPv%	1	2	3	4	5	6	7	8	9	10	11	12	13	14	15
Fianna Fáil	Noel Ahern		2,282	2,282	2,285	2,292	2,297	2,308	2,314	2,329	2,403	2,490					
Fianna Fáil	Michael Barrett TD*		2,261	2,264	2,271	2,274	2,302	2,316	2,330	2,372	2,555						
Fianna Fáil	Tim Killeen		1,463	1,466	1,469	1,473	1,475	1,475	1,482	1,508	1,595	1,639	1,681	1,713	1,739	1,888	2,075
Fine Gael	Alice Glenn TD*		1,415	1,416	1,420	1,441	1,446	1,461	1,474	1,522	1,538	1,540	1,544	1,563	2,089	2,124	2,347
Fine Gael	Eddie Nolan		1,023	1,025	1,031	1,043	1,052	1,069	1,076	1,095	1,102	1,103	1,103	1,116	1,435	1,455	1,685
Sinn Féin	Ann O'Sullivan		966	968	972	974	982	996	1,040	1,055	1,068	1,070	1,070	1,100	1,104		
Fine Gael	Sen. Luke Belton*		937	937	939	949	954	964	968	983	987	989	994	1,003			
Workers' Party	Eamonn O'Brien		888	889	912	915	938	962	1,026	1,047	1,092	1,096	1,097	1,770	1,780	2,117	2,370
Workers' Party	Philomena Donnelly		741	742	749	758	773	813	829	884	896	900	903				
Labour	Paddy Dunne*		720	720	769	857	869	893	920	993	1,009	1,013	1,015	1,083	1,157	1,242	
Fianna Fáil	Kathleen Farrell		443	444	449	451	455	455	475	490							
Independent	Mollie Bracken-Community		311	312	315	317	339	377	418								
Green Alliance	Carolyn Wilson		235	235	237	248	260										
Independent	Barney Hartnett		232	238	243	243	270	303									
Independent	Billy Keegan		161	186	187	189											
Labour	Paul McDonnell		155	155	180												
Labour	Ina Gould		148	149													
Independent	Lily Keegan		47														
Electorate: 36,402 Valid: 14,428 (40.15%) Spoilt: 186 Quota: 2,405 Turnout: 14,614

=== Finglas ===
Finglas: 4 seats
Party	Candidate	FPv%	Count													
Party	Candidate	FPv%	1	2	3	4	5	6	7	8	9	10	11	12	13	14
Fianna Fáil	Jim Tunney TD*		3,175													
Workers' Party	Proinsias De Rossa TD		2,266	2,329	2,365	2,421										
Fianna Fáil	Pat Carey		1,218	1,487	1,500	1,515	1,515	1,532	1,569	1,588	1,616	1,700	1,749	1,841	1,931	2,132
Fine Gael	Mary Flaherty TD*		1,056	1,099	1,110	1,125	1,125	1,152	1,172	1,194	1,241	1,293	1,638	1,772	1,880	1,961
Sinn Féin	Harry Fleming		798	808	812	821	821	826	845	867	881	908	915	952	1,111	
Fianna Fáil	Celia Larkin		724	1,024	1,040	1,047	1,047	1,070	1,079	1,099	1,120	1,171	1,184	1,227	1,298	1,459
Workers' Party	Pat Quearney		522	528	530	544	546	589	620	668	691	745	760	867		
Fine Gael	Frank Barr		437	444	455	460	460	479	487	500	527	547				
Independent	Frank Carroll		315	325	334	340	340	353	374	432	448					
Labour	Diana Robertson*		298	307	309	315	315	322	388	412	547	630	659			
Labour	Bill Tormey		265	279	282	294	294	314	350	372						
Labour	Shay Carbin		250	256	260	271	271	280								
Green Alliance	Aidan, Michael Meagher		211	215	219	249	249									
Democratic Socialist	Mary, E. McCamley		204	208	213											
Independent	Billy Keegan		183	190	235	251	252	295	309							
Independent	Gerard Doolan		106	109												
Independent	Frank Clarke		59	61												
Electorate: 27,997 Valid: 12,087 (43.91%) Spoilt: 206 Quota: 2,418 Turnout: 12,293

=== North Inner City ===
North Inner City: 5 seats
Party	Candidate	FPv%	Count											
Party	Candidate	FPv%	1	2	3	4	5	6	7	8	9	10	11	12
Fianna Fáil	Bertie Ahern TD*		4,316											
Independent	Tony Gregory TD*		3,766											
Fianna Fáil	John Stafford		1,633	1,994	2,146	2,152	2,199	2,206	2,226	2,251	2,302	2,634		
Fine Gael	Michael Keating*		1,466	1,538	1,681	1,687	1,701	1,713	1,744	1,775	1,934	1,960	2,603	2,854
Sinn Féin	Christy Burke		1,222	1,268	1,491	1,524	1,538	1,553	1,559	1,664	1,709	1,725	1,739	2,129
Workers' Party	Michael White		820	853	1,061	1,076	1,103	1,162	1,200	1,288	1,389	1,403	1,437	
Fine Gael	Kevin Byrne		642	659	707	710	725	741	760	779	830	835		
Fianna Fáil	Ernie Beggs		481	1,082	1,186	1,189	1,199	1,204	1,221	1,237	1,269	1,530	1,562	1,729
Labour	William Cumiskey*		341	366	413	413	417	427	513	625				
Labour	Joe Costello		290	300	355	367	371	397	447					
Labour	Don Buckley		226	240	270	274	279	298						
Fianna Fáil	Tony Paul Kett		174	673	716	716	718	724	732	740	765			
Green Alliance	Vincent John Murphy		149	151	181	190	207							
Independent	Brian Skerritt		131	138	178	187								
Communist	Norman Cullen		73	75	86									
Independent	Michael Joseph Ward		14	16	23									
Electorate: 35,046 Valid: 15,744 (45.55%) Spoilt: 219 Quota: 2,625 Turnout: 15,963

=== Pembroke ===
Pembroke: 4 seats
Party	Candidate	FPv%	Count										
Party	Candidate	FPv%	1	2	3	4	5	6	7	8	9	10	11
Independent	Carmencita Hederman-Community*		2,454	2,468	2,497	2,722							
Fine Gael	Joe Doyle TD*		2,223	2,232	2,239	2,279	2,298	2,301	2,587	2,693			
Fianna Fáil	Seán Moore*		2,139	2,150	2,160	2,181	2,459	2,461	2,476	2,621	3,331		
Fine Gael	John McKenna		879	884	892	911	941	943	1,389	1,423	1,477	1,491	2,060
Fianna Fáil	Ellen Gunning (Whelan)		864	873	877	893	1,003	1,005	1,019	1,166			
Fianna Fáil	Eoin David Ryan		848	848	856	869	1,122	1,124	1,165	1,211	1,460	1,951	2,172
Workers' Party	Tom Crilly		814	835	861	937	951	958	969				
Fine Gael	Cliona O'Tuama		779	782	796	840	867	872					
Fianna Fáil	Ciaran J. O'Loughlin		742	744	746	764							
Labour	Dermot Lacey		632	633	930	995	1,009	1,020	1,060	1,333	1,402	1,441	
Green Alliance	Enid O'Dowd		558	562	574								
Labour	James Connolly Heron		420	421									
Independent	William Coughlan		87										
Electorate: 37,400 Valid: 13,439 (36.37%) Spoilt: 165 Quota: 2,688 Turnout: 13,604

=== Rathmines ===
Rathmines: 4 seats
Party	Candidate	FPv%	Count										
Party	Candidate	FPv%	1	2	3	4	5	6	7	8	9	10	11
Fine Gael	Sen. Alexis FitzGerald*		2,555										
Fianna Fáil	Michael Donnelly		2,133	2,144	2,153	2,193	2,220	2,382					
Fine Gael	Michael McShane*		1,042	1,210	1,226	1,271	1,307	1,330	1,331	1,378	1,574	1,732	1,818
Fianna Fáil	Mary Hanafin		890	898	909	923	938	1,069	1,138	1,205	1,275	1,455	2,348
Fianna Fáil	Gerry Kieran		849	852	857	873	882	1,079	1,118	1,139	1,168	1,246	
Fine Gael	Edie Wynne		811	880	892	946	956	964	965	1,046	1,294	1,458	1,500
Workers' Party	Anne Cooney		674	677	698	726	795	804	806	930	1,147		
Fianna Fáil	Derek Mooney		534	537	542	546	553						
Labour	Vicki Somers		473	482	508	527	770	778	779	909			
Green	Maire Mullarney		430	432	486	566	574	575	575				
Labour	Brendan Byrne*		393	400	425	444							
Independent	Barry John Community-Hardy		308	310	366								
Independent	Tonie Walsh		167	167									
Independent	William Abbey Of The Holy Cross Fitzsimon		60	60									
Independent	Gabriel Joseph McGovern		22	23									
Electorate: 34,320 Valid: 11,341 (33.53%) Spoilt: 165 Quota: 2,269 Turnout: 11,506

=== South Inner City ===
South Inner City: 5 seats
Party	Candidate	FPv%	Count																
Party	Candidate	FPv%	1	2	3	4	5	6	7	8	9	10	11	12	13	14	15	16	17
Fianna Fáil	Mary Mooney		1,907	1,908	1,910	1,923	1,934	1,959	1,971	2,017	2,060	2,089	2,285						
Independent	Brendan Lynch*		1,520	1,525	1,528	1,538	1,558	1,593	1,622	1,665	1,703	1,734	1,768	1,773	1,819	2,071	2,152	2,323	
Fine Gael	Peter Burke*		1,418	1,420	1,421	1,424	1,436	1,452	1,460	1,484	1,520	1,972	1,984	1,986	1,999	2,047	2,082	2,357	
Sinn Féin	John Crabbe		1,095	1,095	1,110	1,118	1,126	1,134	1,160	1,164	1,173	1,178	1,192	1,195	1,223	1,406	1,429	1,492	1,507
Fianna Fáil	Michael Mulcahy		892	893	894	900	902	903	913	937	944	954	1,126	1,169	1,180	1,205	1,929	1,990	2,025
Workers' Party	Andy Smith		781	782	797	803	812	818	843	850	882	897	909	913	1,413	1,513	1,559	1,765	1,822
Fianna Fáil	Des Smith		745	745	748	750	754	761	777	783	790	803	1,021	1,062	1,073	1,102			
Fianna Fáil	Aindrias Ó Caoimh*		680	681	681	682	683	683	686	692	699	706							
Workers' Party	Eddie Naughton		625	628	635	641	654	664	677	689	723	729	734	734					
Fine Gael	Anne O'Regan		619	620	621	627	640	649	657	668	689								
Independent	John Whacker Humphrey		603	608	611	649	676	728	777	783	802	809	818	821	869				
Labour	Mary Freehill*		602	603	606	620	660	679	697	785	1,004	1,072	1,082	1,083	1,104	1,155	1,188		
Labour	Tony Ryder		386	386	389	396	399	406	426	506									
Labour	Jim Mooney		348	349	350	356	359	370	375										
Independent	William Ormonde		237	238	241	248	256	266											
Independent	Larry P. Dillon		202	202	204	214	230												
Green Alliance	Thérése Cronin		185	185	196	197													
Independent	Christy Doyle		151	151	151														
Communist	Michael Wall		73	74															
Independent	Desmond Hunter		25																
Electorate: 34,715 Valid: 13,094 (38.57%) Spoilt: 294 Quota: 2,183 Turnout: 13,388
