= Dublin North-East =

Dáil constituency (1937–1977, 1981–2016)

- Former Dáil constituency
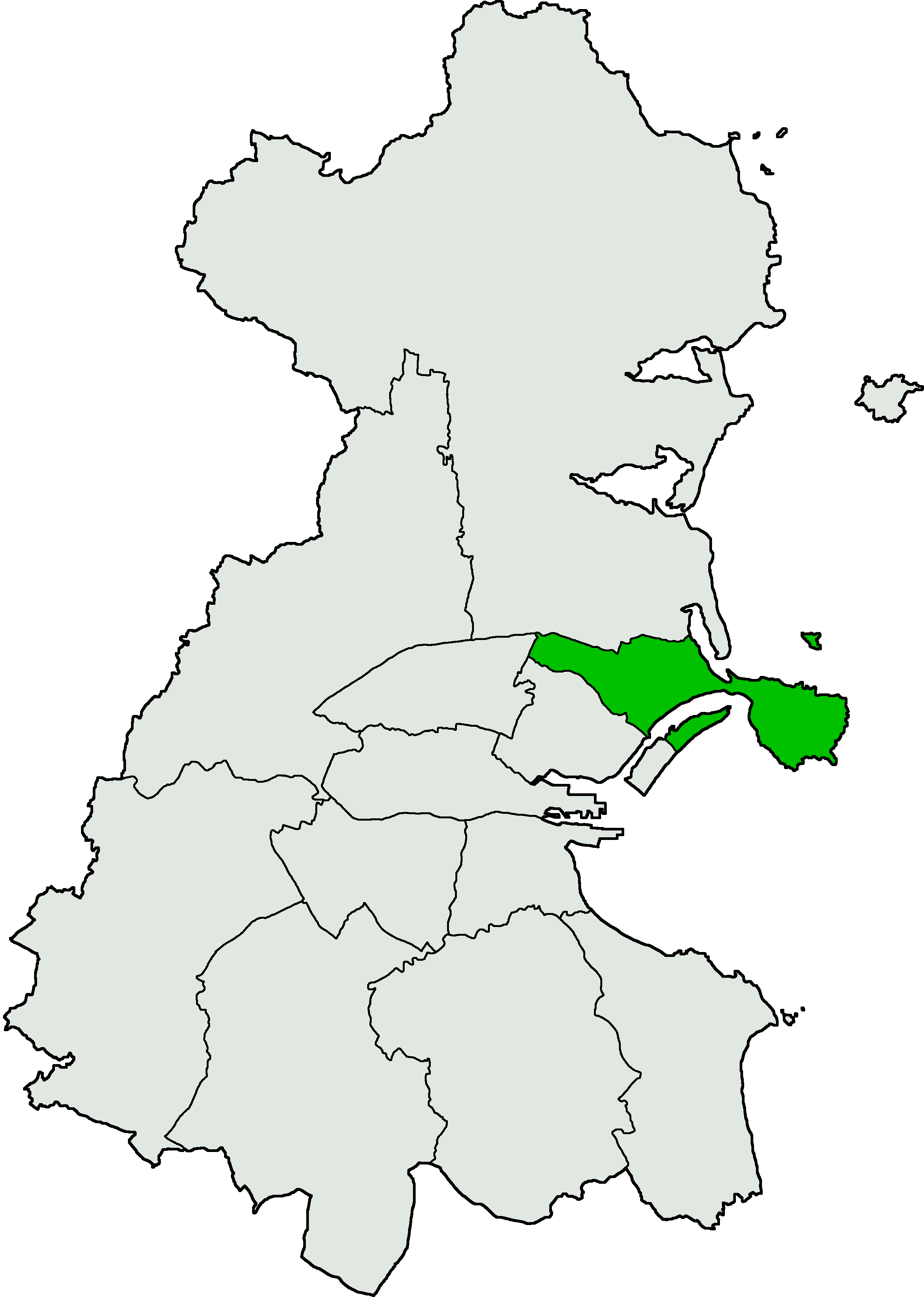
- Location of Dublin North-East within County Dublin

Former constituency
- Created: 1981
- Abolished: 2016
- Seats: 4 (1981–2002); 3 (2002–2016)
- Local government areas: Dublin City; Fingal
- Replaced by: Dublin Bay North

Dublin North-East
- Former Dáil constituency

Former constituency
- Created: 1937
- Abolished: 1977
- Seats: 3 (1937–1948); 5 (1948–1969); 4 (1969–1977)
- Local government area: Dublin City

Dublin North-East was a parliamentary constituency represented in Dáil Éireann, the lower house of the Irish parliament or Oireachtas, from 1937 to 1977 and from 1981 to 2016. The method of election was proportional representation by means of the single transferable vote (PR-STV).

== History and boundaries ==
The constituency was created for the 1937 general election when the Dublin North constituency was divided into Dublin North-West and Dublin North-East. It was abolished in 1977 as a result of the Electoral (Amendment) Act 1974 when it was largely replaced by the Dublin Artane constituency before being recreated in 1981. It was subsumed into the new Dublin Bay North constituency at the 2016 general election.

Changes to the Dublin North-East constituency 1937–2016
Years	TDs	Boundaries	Notes
1937–1948	3	In the county borough of Dublin, the Clontarf East, Clontarf West, Drumcondra and North Dock Wards; and The portion of the Mountjoy Ward bounded by a line drawn as follows:— Starting at the point in the boundary of the said Ward along Seán Mac Dermott Street Lower where it is intersected by a line drawn along the middle of Buckingham Street Upper and Buckingham Street Lower and proceeding thence in a North-Westerly direction along the middle of Buckingham Street Upper to Summerhill and thence in a North-Easterly direction along the middle of Summerhill to the North Circular Road and thence in a North-Easterly direction along the middle of the North Circular Road to meet the existing boundary of the said Ward along Russell Street and Fitzgibbon Street and thence in a North-Easterly, North-Westerly South Easterly and South-Westerly direction along the existing boundary of the said Ward to the starting point; and The townlands of:— Artane South, Ballyhoy, Bettyville, Charleville, Clonturk, Edenmore, Foxlands, Furrypark, Glebe, Hampstead Hill, Hampstead South, Harmonstown, Kilbarrack Upper, Killester Demesne, Killester North, Maryville, North Bull (Drumcondra Rural), North Bull (Howth Rural), Puckstown, Raheny North, Raheny South and Sibylhill in so far as the same are situate within the County Borough of Dublin.	Created from abolished constituency of Dublin North; and transfer of townlands from Dublin County in line with transfer of territory from the county to the city in 1931.
1948–1961	5	In the county borough of Dublin, The Ballybough, Clontarf East, Clontarf West, Drumcondra North, Drumcondra South, North Dock and Raheny Wards, and the portion of the Mountjoy Ward lying south of a line drawn as follows: Commencing at a point where the middle of Summerhill meets the ward boundary, thence along Summerhill to Hutton's Place, thence along Hutton's Place, Mountjoy Place, Mountjoy Square East and Belvedere Place to the ward boundary; and the portion of County Dublin which lies to the east of a line drawn as follows:—commencing at the point on the boundary of that county where Killester Avenue meets Malahide Road and thence in a south-westerly direction along Malahide Road to the boundary of that county.	
1961–1969	5	In the county borough of Dublin, the Artane, Baldoyle, Ballybough, Beann Éadair, Clontarf East, Clontarf West, Coolock, Drumcondra North, Drumcondra South, Raheny and Santry wards and that part of Glasnevin ward lying to the south-east of a line drawn as follows: commencing at the point of intersection of Botanic Road and the ward boundary along Botanic Road to its intersection with Bothar Mobhi and along Bothar Mobhi to the ward boundary.	
1969–1977	4	In the county borough of Dublin, Artane, Beann Éadair, Coolock, Drumcondra North, Raheny and Santry wards; that part of Clontarf East ward lying north of a line drawn as follows: commencing at the junction of Howth Road with Collins Avenue East, thence in an easterly direction along Howth Road to its junction with Castle Avenue, thence in a southerly direction along Castle Avenue to its junction with Vernon Avenue, thence in an easterly direction along Vernon Avenue to its junction with Sybil Hill Road, thence in an easterly direction along the imaginary easterly projection of Vernon Avenue to its junction with the southern boundary of St. Anne's Park, thence commencing in an easterly direction and proceeding along the said boundary and along its imaginary easterly projection to its intersection by Mount Prospect Avenue, thence in a northerly direction along Mount Prospect Avenue to its junction with the imaginary westerly projection of the northern boundary of Manresa Retreat House, thence commencing in an easterly direction and proceeding along the said imaginary projection, along the northern boundary of Manresa Retreat House and along its imaginary south-easterly projection to its first intersection by the ward boundary; and that part of Clontarf West ward lying north of a line drawn as follows: commencing at the junction of Malahide Road with the imaginary north-westerly projection of the northern boundary of the Clontarf Golf Course, thence commencing in a south-easterly direction and proceeding along the said projection and boundary and along its imaginary north-easterly projection to its intersection by Collins Avenue East, thence in a south-easterly direction along Collins Avenue East to its junction with the ward boundary.	Transfer of Baldoyle to Dublin County North; Transfer to Dublin North-Central of Ballybough and Drumcondra South, parts of Clontarf East and Clontarf West, and the remaining part of Glasnevin.
1977–1981	–	Constituency abolished	Artane and Drumcondra North and Santry A moved to Dublin Artane; Beann Éadair, Raheny and part of Clontarf East moved to Dublin Clontarf; Coolock and Santry A moved to Dublin County North; remaining part of Clontarf West moved to Dublin North-Central.
1981–1992	4	In the county borough of Dublin, the wards of Artane A, Artane B, Baldoyle, Beann Éadair A, Beann Éadair B, Coolock A, Coolock B, Raheny A, Raheny B and in County Dublin, the district electoral division of Coolock (except the parts thereof which are comprised in the constituencies of Dublin North and Dublin North-Central).	Artane A and B from Dublin Artane Baldoyle, Beann Éadair A, Beann Éadair B, Coolock A, Coolock B, Raheny A, Raheny B from Dublin Clontarf part of Coolock from Dublin County North. (No change in 1987)
1992–2002	4	In the county borough of Dublin, the wards of Ayrfield, Clontarf East A, Edenmore, Grange A, Grange B, Grange C, Grange D, Grange E, Kilmore C, Priorswood A, Priorswood B, Priorswood C, Priorswood D, Priorswood E, Raheny-Foxfield, Raheny Greendale, Raheny-St. Assam; and in County Dublin, the district electoral divisions of Baldoyle, Howth, Sutton	Transfer of Ennafort–St Annes area from Dublin North-Central, and minor transfer from Dublin North. Wards and DEDs redefined in 1986.
2002–2007	3	In the city of Dublin, the electoral divisions of Ayrfield, Grange A, Grange B, Grange C, Grange D, Priorswood D, Priorswood E, Raheny-Foxfield, Raheny-Greendale, Raheny-St. Assam; and those parts of the electoral divisions of Priorswood A, Priorswood B and Priorswood C situated south of a line drawn as follows— commencing at the intersection of the western boundary of the electoral division of Priorswood A by the M50 Northern Cross, thence commencing in an easterly direction and proceeding along the said M50 and the N32 (Northern Cross Extension) to the intersection of the said N32 by the eastern boundary of the electoral division of Priorswood C, passing in a clockwise direction around and including the following three roundabouts, viz. roundabout No. 3 at the junction of the M50 Northern Cross with the M1 Motorway, the roundabout at the junction of the N32 (Northern Cross Extension) with Clonshaugh Road and the roundabout at the junction of the N32 (Northern Cross Extension) with the Malahide Road; and in Fingal, the electoral divisions of Baldoyle, Sutton, Howth.	Transfer of population to Dublin North-Central in the Kilmore, Edenmore and Raheny areas; Alignment of northern boundary of with the M50 and its Malahide Road extension.
2007–2011	3	In the city of Dublin, the electoral divisions of Ayrfield, Edenmore, Grange A, Grange B, Grange C, Grange D, Grange E, Priorswood D, Priorswood E, Raheny-Foxfield, Raheny-Greendale, Raheny-St. Assam; and those parts of the electoral divisions of Priorswood A, Priorswood B and Priorswood C situated south of a line drawn along the Northern Cross Route (M50) and the Northern Cross Extension (N32), passing in a clockwise direction around and including the following three roundabouts, viz. roundabout No. 3 at the junction of the Northern Cross Route (M50) with the M1 Motorway, the roundabout at the junction of the Northern Cross Route (M50) with Clonshaugh Road and the roundabout at the junction of the Northern Cross Extension (N32) with Malahide Road (R107); and in Fingal, the electoral divisions of Baldoyle, Sutton, Howth.	Transfer of Grange E and Edenmore from Dublin North-Central.
2011–2016	3	In the city of Dublin, the electoral divisions of Ayrfield, Grange A, Grange B, Grange C, Grange D, Grange E, Priorswood A, Priorswood B, Priorswood C, Priorswood D, Priorswood E, Raheny-Foxfield, Raheny-Greendale, Raheny-St. Assam; and in Fingal, the electoral divisions of Baldoyle, Balgriffin, Howth, Portmarnock North, Portmarnock South, Sutton; and that part of the electoral division of Turnapin situated north of a line drawn along the Northern Cross Route (M50), passing in a clockwise direction around and excluding roundabout No. 3 at the junction of the Northern Cross Route (M50) with the M1 motorway.	Transfer from Dublin North of Balgriffin, Portmarnock North, Portmarnock South and Turnapin (part north of M50) in Fingal, and of parts north of N32 of Priorswood A, Priorswood B, Priorswood C in Dublin City.
2016	—	Constituency abolished	Transfer to Dublin Fingal of Balgriffin, Portmarnock North, Portmarnock South and Turnapin (part north of M50). Remainder of constituency merged with Dublin North-Central to form Dublin Bay North.

== TDs ==
=== TDs 1937–1977 ===
Teachtaí Dála (TDs) for Dublin North-East 1937–1977
Key to parties: CnaP = Clann na Poblachta; FF = Fianna Fáil; FG = Fine Gael; Ind. = Independent; Lab = Labour
Dáil	Election	Deputy (Party)	Deputy (Party)	Deputy (Party)	Deputy (Party)	Deputy (Party)
9th	1937	Alfie Byrne (Ind.)	Oscar Traynor (FF)	James Larkin (Ind.)	3 seats 1937–1948	
10th	1938	Alfie Byrne (Ind.)	Oscar Traynor (FF)	Richard Mulcahy (FG)	3 seats 1937–1948	
11th	1943	Alfie Byrne (Ind.)	Oscar Traynor (FF)	James Larkin (Lab)	3 seats 1937–1948	
12th	1944	Alfie Byrne (Ind.)	Oscar Traynor (FF)	Harry Colley (FF)	3 seats 1937–1948	
13th	1948	Alfie Byrne (Ind.)	Oscar Traynor (FF)	Harry Colley (FF)	Jack Belton (FG)	Peadar Cowan (CnaP)
14th	1951	Alfie Byrne (Ind.)	Oscar Traynor (FF)	Harry Colley (FF)	Jack Belton (FG)	Peadar Cowan (Ind.)
15th	1954	Alfie Byrne (Ind.)	Oscar Traynor (FF)	Harry Colley (FF)	Jack Belton (FG)	Denis Larkin (Lab)
15th	1956 by-election	Patrick Byrne (FG)	Oscar Traynor (FF)	Harry Colley (FF)	Jack Belton (FG)	Denis Larkin (Lab)
16th	1957	Patrick Byrne (FG)	Oscar Traynor (FF)	Charles Haughey (FF)	Jack Belton (FG)	Denis Larkin (Lab)
17th	1961	Patrick Byrne (FG)	George Colley (FF)	Charles Haughey (FF)	Jack Belton (FG)	Eugene Timmons (FF)
17th	1963 by-election	Patrick Byrne (FG)	George Colley (FF)	Charles Haughey (FF)	Paddy Belton (FG)	Eugene Timmons (FF)
18th	1965	Patrick Byrne (FG)	George Colley (FF)	Charles Haughey (FF)	Paddy Belton (FG)	Denis Larkin (Lab)
19th	1969	Conor Cruise O'Brien (Lab)	Eugene Timmons (FF)	Charles Haughey (FF)	Paddy Belton (FG)	4 seats 1969–1977
20th	1973	Conor Cruise O'Brien (Lab)	Eugene Timmons (FF)	Charles Haughey (FF)	Paddy Belton (FG)	4 seats 1969–1977
21st	1977	Constituency abolished				

Note: The columns in this table are used only for presentational purposes, and no significance should be attached to the order of columns. For details of the order in which seats were won at each election, see the detailed results of that election.

=== TDs 1981–2016 ===
Teachtaí Dála (TDs) for Dublin North-East 1981–2016
Key to parties: FF = Fianna Fáil; FG = Fine Gael; Ind. = Independent; Lab = Labour; WP = Workers' Party
Dáil	Election	Deputy (Party)	Deputy (Party)	Deputy (Party)	Deputy (Party)
22nd	1981	Michael Woods (FF)	Liam Fitzgerald (FF)	Seán Dublin Bay Rockall Loftus (Ind.)	Michael Joe Cosgrave (FG)
23rd	1982 (Feb)	Michael Woods (FF)	Maurice Manning (FG)	Ned Brennan (FF)	Michael Joe Cosgrave (FG)
24th	1982 (Nov)	Michael Woods (FF)	Maurice Manning (FG)	Liam Fitzgerald (FF)	Michael Joe Cosgrave (FG)
25th	1987	Michael Woods (FF)	Pat McCartan (WP)	Liam Fitzgerald (FF)	Michael Joe Cosgrave (FG)
26th	1989	Michael Woods (FF)	Pat McCartan (WP)	Liam Fitzgerald (FF)	Michael Joe Cosgrave (FG)
27th	1992	Michael Woods (FF)	Tommy Broughan (Lab)	Liam Fitzgerald (FF)	Seán Kenny (Lab)
28th	1997	Michael Woods (FF)	Tommy Broughan (Lab)	Martin Brady (FF)	Michael Joe Cosgrave (FG)
29th	2002	Michael Woods (FF)	Tommy Broughan (Lab)	Martin Brady (FF)	3 seats from 2002
30th	2007	Michael Woods (FF)	Tommy Broughan (Lab)	Terence Flanagan (FG)	3 seats from 2002
31st	2011	Seán Kenny (Lab)	Tommy Broughan (Lab)	Terence Flanagan (FG)	3 seats from 2002
32nd	2016	Constituency abolished. See Dublin Bay North			

Note: The columns in this table are used only for presentational purposes, and no significance should be attached to the order of columns. For details of the order in which seats were won at each election, see the detailed results of that election.

== Elections ==
*: Outgoing TD

=== 2011 general election ===
2011 general election: Dublin North-East
Party	Candidate	FPv%	Count								
Party	Candidate	FPv%	1	2	3	4	5	6	7	8	9
Fine Gael	Terence Flanagan	29.5	12,332								
Labour	Tommy Broughan	23.9	10,006	10,738							
Sinn Féin	Larry O'Toole	12.0	5,032	5,120	5,143	5,179	5,477	5,554	5,754	6,262	6,923
Fianna Fáil	Averil Power	11.5	4,794	5,013	5,036	5,109	5,134	5,314	5,579	6,041	
Labour	Seán Kenny	10.4	4,365	4,728	4,885	4,985	5,216	5,580	6,000	7,013	9,369
New Vision	Eamonn Blaney (Note: New Vision was an electoral alliance of independent non-party candidates and did not appear on the ballot.)	4.2	1,773	1,894	1,913	2,099	2,233	2,401	2,955		
Independent	Jimmy Guerin	3.1	1,283	1,419	1,447	1,572	1,685	1,799			
Socialist Party	Brian Greene (Note: Greene campaigned as a member of the United Left Alliance.)	2.1	869	893	897	935					
Green	David Healy	1.9	792	919	934	987	1,049				
Independent	Raymond Sexton	0.8	351	391	397						
Independent	Robert Eastwood	0.6	242	264	267						
Electorate: 58,542 Valid: 41,839 Spoilt: 448 (1.1%) Quota: 10,460 Turnout: 42,287 (72.2%)

=== 2007 general election ===
2007 general election: Dublin North-East
Party	Candidate	FPv%	Count			
Party	Candidate	FPv%	1	2	3	4
Fianna Fáil	Michael Woods	20.1	7,003	7,402	7,588	8,430
Fianna Fáil	Martin Brady	19.6	6,861	7,252	7,395	8,095
Labour	Tommy Broughan	15.2	5,294	6,221	6,909	8,911
Sinn Féin	Larry O'Toole	13.3	4,661	4,983	5,089	
Fine Gael	Terence Flanagan	12.8	4,483	5,000	7,751	8,594
Fine Gael	Brody Sweeney	10.1	3,529	3,946		
Green	David Healy	6.7	2,349			
Progressive Democrats	Keith Redmond	2.2	749			
Electorate: 53,778 Valid: 34,929 Spoilt: 323 (0.9%) Quota: 8,733 Turnout: 35,252 (65.6%)

=== 2002 general election ===
2002 general election: Dublin North-East
Party	Candidate	FPv%	Count					
Party	Candidate	FPv%	1	2	3	4	5	6
Fianna Fáil	Michael Woods	22.0	6,457	6,742	6,911	7,138	7,552	
Fianna Fáil	Martin Brady	18.1	5,304	5,531	5,657	5,776	6,055	6,909
Labour	Tommy Broughan	16.2	4,758	4,931	5,426	5,876	6,825	8,426
Sinn Féin	Larry O'Toole	10.2	3,003	3,083	3,286	3,373	3,720	
Fine Gael	Michael Joe Cosgrave	8.0	2,349	2,454	2,546			
Fine Gael	Gavin Doyle	7.4	2,155	2,373	2,575	4,085	4,648	4,937
Ind. Health Alliance	Mark Harold	7.2	2,116	2,321	2,806	2,912		
Green	David Healy	5.7	1,656	1,856				
Progressive Democrats	Noelle Ryan	4.2	1,219					
Independent	Thomas Jenkinson	1.0	301					
Electorate: 52,105 Valid: 29,318 Spoilt: 316 (1.1%) Quota: 7,330 Turnout: 29,634 (56.9%)

=== 1997 general election ===
1997 general election: Dublin North-East
Party	Candidate	FPv%	Count									
Party	Candidate	FPv%	1	2	3	4	5	6	7	8	9	10
Fianna Fáil	Michael Woods	15.4	5,735	5,831	5,907	6,031	6,439	6,586	7,573			
Fianna Fáil	Martin Brady	13.5	5,018	5,067	5,135	5,243	5,577	5,630	6,315	6,572	6,624	6,745
Fianna Fáil	Liam Fitzgerald	11.8	4,394	4,433	4,511	4,594	4,937	5,016	5,668	6,040	6,100	6,221
Fine Gael	Michael J. Cosgrave	11.2	4,173	4,318	4,412	4,549	4,628	6,675	7,122	7,748		
Labour	Tommy Broughan	9.2	3,447	3,516	3,912	4,212	4,622	4,913	5,146	7,738		
Labour	Seán Kenny	8.0	2,986	3,036	3,316	3,521	3,843	4,122	4,313			
Progressive Democrats	Mairéad Foley	7.8	2,911	2,949	3,028	3,193	3,295	3,488				
Fine Gael	Joan Maher	7.7	2,877	2,915	2,985	3,127	3,159					
Sinn Féin	Larry O'Toole	5.9	2,212	2,288	2,401	2,556						
Democratic Left	Anthony Creevey	3.7	1,381	1,425								
Green	Donna Cooney	3.6	1,332	1,476	1,607							
Independent	Owen Poole	1.7	641									
Natural Law	John Burns	0.4	155									
Independent	Lar Fraser	0.1	39									
Electorate: 59,497 Valid: 37,301 Spoilt: 368 (1.0%) Quota: 7,461 Turnout: 37,669 (63.3%)

=== 1992 general election ===
1992 general election: Dublin North-East
Party	Candidate	FPv%	Count											
Party	Candidate	FPv%	1	2	3	4	5	6	7	8	9	10	11	12
Labour	Seán Kenny	22.2	8,873											
Fianna Fáil	Michael Woods	17.1	6,850	6,900	6,910	6,927	6,959	7,089	7,254	7,522	8,536			
Fianna Fáil	Liam Fitzgerald	10.0	4,011	4,047	4,053	4,058	4,067	4,183	4,259	4,364	5,646	6,091	6,284	6,911
Democratic Left	Pat McCartan	9.4	3,743	3,850	3,859	3,921	3,982	4,197	4,511	4,715	4,853	4,882	5,160	
Fine Gael	Michael Joe Cosgrave	8.3	3,311	3,354	3,359	3,366	3,397	3,414	3,494	3,996	4,121	4,143	6,028	6,679
Labour	Tommy Broughan	7.9	3,162	3,687	3,707	3,769	3,834	4,034	4,400	4,670	4,816	4,840	5,184	7,696
Fianna Fáil	Martin Brady	6.7	2,673	2,691	2,693	2,706	2,717	2,770	2,843	2,904				
Fine Gael	Joan Maher	5.5	2,181	2,202	2,206	2,213	2,248	2,253	2,342	2,977	3,009	3,022		
Progressive Democrats	Stephen O'Byrnes	5.1	2,034	2,052	2,055	2,059	2,089	2,091	2,182					
Sinn Féin	Larry O'Toole	2.7	1,088	1,097	1,100	1,116	1,133							
Green	Sadhbh O'Neill	2.3	931	949	964	989	1,528	1,749						
Green	David Healy	2.0	795	805	832	856								
Workers' Party	Marian Donnelly	0.6	239	250	259									
Independent	John Burns	0.3	118	122										
Electorate: 58,433 Valid: 40,009 Spoilt: 640 (1.6%) Quota: 8,003 Turnout: 40,649 (69.6%)

=== 1989 general election ===
1989 general election: Dublin North-East
Party	Candidate	FPv%	Count								
Party	Candidate	FPv%	1	2	3	4	5	6	7	8	9
Fianna Fáil	Michael Woods	17.8	6,284	6,314	6,355	6,371	6,428	6,571	6,796	6,955	7,150
Workers' Party	Pat McCartan	17.0	5,968	6,032	6,163	6,291	6,380	6,874	8,295		
Fianna Fáil	Liam Fitzgerald	16.4	5,775	5,799	5,828	5,864	5,893	6,005	6,276	6,412	6,539
Fianna Fáil	Seán Haughey	13.0	4,567	4,577	4,596	4,636	4,654	4,729	4,859	4,918	4,984
Fine Gael	Michael Joe Cosgrave	11.3	3,965	3,976	3,996	4,056	4,277	4,452	4,779	5,063	8,123
Fine Gael	Maurice Manning	7.8	2,743	2,752	2,776	2,793	3,112	3,311	3,520	3,708	
Labour	Seán Kenny	6.0	2,111	2,151	2,227	2,672	2,711	2,940			
Green	Máire Mullarney	3.8	1,332	1,421	1,577	1,602	1,663				
Progressive Democrats	Noel Peers	2.3	817	821	842	850					
Labour	Tommy Broughan	2.1	755	778	794						
Independent	Angela Mulligan	1.4	505	560							
Independent	Paddy Healy	1.1	394								
Electorate: 53,043 Valid: 35,216 Quota: 7,044 Turnout: 66.4%

=== 1987 general election ===
1987 general election: Dublin North-East
Party	Candidate	FPv%	Count											
Party	Candidate	FPv%	1	2	3	4	5	6	7	8	9	10	11	12
Fianna Fáil	Liam Fitzgerald	16.7	6,378	6,379	6,406	6,484	6,548	6,808	8,239					
Fianna Fáil	Michael Woods	15.5	5,927	5,930	5,955	6,009	6,100	6,305	7,254	7,530	7,634	8,184		
Fianna Fáil	Seán Haughey	11.0	4,222	4,222	4,237	4,335	4,362	4,516	5,055	5,314	5,356	5,513	5,916	6,107
Fine Gael	Michael Joe Cosgrave	9.6	3,658	3,662	3,685	3,704	3,817	4,001	4,184	4,194	7,289	10,333		
Fine Gael	Maurice Manning	9.4	3,585	3,594	3,617	3,628	3,800	4,089	4,132	4,139				
Workers' Party	Pat McCartan	8.6	3,297	3,311	3,454	3,668	3,716	4,653	4,781	4,806	4,995	5,509	6,260	6,342
Fianna Fáil	Ned Brennan	8.2	3,136	3,140	3,155	3,200	3,241	3,370						
Progressive Democrats	Neil Holman	7.0	2,691	2,700	2,724	2,741	4,100	4,291	4,349	4,355	4,971			
Labour	Seán Kenny	5.8	2,227	2,241	2,314	2,397	2,461							
Progressive Democrats	Martin McGettigan	5.1	1,964	1,972	1,987	1,996								
Sinn Féin	Pamela Kane	1.7	655	666	720									
Independent	Paddy Healy	1.1	430	458										
Independent	Barbara Hyland	0.3	109											
Electorate: 50,848 Valid: 38,279 Quota: 7,656 Turnout: 75.3%

=== November 1982 general election ===
November 1982 general election: Dublin North-East
Party	Candidate	FPv%	Count							
Party	Candidate	FPv%	1	2	3	4	5	6	7	8
Fianna Fáil	Michael Woods	22.2	7,213							
Fine Gael	Michael Joe Cosgrave	19.5	6,343	6,370	6,463	6,823				
Fine Gael	Maurice Manning	13.5	4,390	4,399	4,511	4,763	4,981	5,980	6,131	6,633
Fianna Fáil	Liam Fitzgerald	10.5	3,418	3,729	3,752	4,002	4,017	4,259	7,754	
Fianna Fáil	Ned Brennan	10.1	3,281	3,582	3,592	3,895	3,920	4,151		
Workers' Party	Pat McCartan	9.4	3,056	3,076	3,149	3,476	3,505	4,734	4,987	5,737
Labour	Seán Kenny	6.9	2,236	2,248	2,728	2,971	3,005			
Independent	Seán Dublin Bay Rockall Loftus	5.3	1,718	1,740	1,804					
Labour	Vincent Manning	2.6	853	862						
Electorate: 45,252 Valid: 32,508 Quota: 6,502 Turnout: 71.8%

=== February 1982 general election ===
February 1982 general election: Dublin North-East
Party	Candidate	FPv%	Count								
Party	Candidate	FPv%	1	2	3	4	5	6	7	8	9
Fianna Fáil	Michael Woods	30.3	9,662								
Fine Gael	Michael Joe Cosgrave	19.1	6,098	6,236	6,261	6,338	6,871				
Fine Gael	Maurice Manning	12.8	4,076	4,133	4,150	4,232	4,739	5,118	5,824	6,670	
Fianna Fáil	Ned Brennan	10.2	3,261	4,424	4,449	4,474	4,583	4,599	5,083	5,551	5,700
Fianna Fáil	Liam Fitzgerald	8.6	2,751	4,367	4,402	4,430	4,580	4,597	4,977	5,473	5,616
Sinn Féin The Workers' Party	Pat McCartan	5.7	1,825	1,899	1,969	2,020	2,381	2,412	2,826		
Independent	Seán Dublin Bay Rockall Loftus	5.7	1,814	1,935	1,990	2,033	2,210	2,239			
Labour	Seán Kenny	4.6	1,452	1,515	1,537	1,966					
Labour	Bernard Malone	2.2	685	715	742						
Independent	Michael O'Donoghue	0.5	155	170							
Independent	James Connolly	0.3	108	115							
Electorate: 43,179 Valid: 31,887 Spoilt: 299 (0.9%) Quota: 6,378 Turnout: 32,186 (74.5%)

=== 1981 general election ===
1981 general election: Dublin North-East
Party	Candidate	FPv%	Count											
Party	Candidate	FPv%	1	2	3	4	5	6	7	8	9	10	11	12
Fianna Fáil	Michael Woods	32.7	10,605											
Fine Gael	Michael Joe Cosgrave	17.9	5,816	6,068	6,084	6,154	6,446	6,533						
Fine Gael	Maurice Manning	7.9	2,581	2,657	2,668	2,688	2,991	3,077	3,122	3,223	3,487	4,662	4,795	5,170
Independent	Seán Dublin Bay Rockall Loftus	7.4	2,395	2,580	2,600	2,645	2,669	2,738	2,957	3,220	3,649	4,352	4,645	5,554
Fianna Fáil	Ned Brennan	5.8	1,870	3,068	3,081	3,105	3,113	3,123	3,231	3,321	3,602	3,762		
Fianna Fáil	Liam Fitzgerald	5.0	1,620	3,524	3,548	3,611	3,624	3,664	3,855	4,012	4,468	4,762	7,758	
Labour	Seán Kenny	4.8	1,554	1,647	1,688	1,950	1,988	2,501	2,600	3,076	3,361			
Independent	Thomas Brennan	4.6	1,477	1,626	1,642	1,648	1,674	1,741	1,823	2,026				
Sinn Féin The Workers' Party	Pat McCartan	3.4	1,094	1,160	1,239	1,256	1,270	1,326	1,632					
Anti H-Block	Paddy Healy	3.3	1,063	1,115	1,146	1,150	1,156	1,166						
Labour	Bernard Malone	2.3	744	790	840	931	976							
Fine Gael	Patricia Kelly	2.3	729	756	768	778								
Labour	John Brennan	1.7	554	610	620									
Socialist Labour	Michael O'Donoghue	0.9	309	327										
Electorate: 43,598 Valid: 32,411 Spoilt: 243 (0.7%) Quota: 6,483 Turnout: 32,654 (74.9%)

=== 1973 general election ===
1973 general election: Dublin North-East
Party	Candidate	FPv%	Count						
Party	Candidate	FPv%	1	2	3	4	5	6	7
Fianna Fáil	Charles Haughey	30.1	12,901						
Labour	Conor Cruise O'Brien	18.1	7,774	7,917	7,981	8,127	8,701		
Fine Gael	Paddy Belton	18.1	7,771	7,898	8,349	8,479	8,586		
Fianna Fáil	Eugene Timmons	7.8	3,358	5,020	5,049	5,190	5,216	5,335	9,756
Labour	Paddy Dunne	7.2	3,106	3,160	3,223	3,598	4,402	5,975	6,108
Fianna Fáil	Timothy Killeen	5.6	2,414	4,553	4,584	4,701	4,725	4,812	
Fine Gael	James Kelly	3.9	1,678	1,728	2,185	2,277	2,381		
Labour	Joseph O'Connor	3.4	1,451	1,500	1,528	1,781			
Aontacht Éireann	Michael Gleeson	3.1	1,325	1,387	1,398				
Fine Gael	Christopher Hoey	2.6	1,110	1,147					
Electorate: 55,483 Valid: 42,888 Quota: 8,578 Turnout: 77.3%

=== 1969 general election ===
1969 general election: Dublin North-East
Party	Candidate	FPv%	Count										
Party	Candidate	FPv%	1	2	3	4	5	6	7	8	9	10	11
Fianna Fáil	Charles Haughey	31.5	11,677										
Labour	Conor Cruise O'Brien	20.5	7,591										
Fine Gael	Paddy Belton	13.3	4,931	5,029	5,075	5,082	5,380	5,380	5,772	5,839	6,273	7,924	
Fianna Fáil	Eugene Timmons	8.3	3,070	5,124	5,178	5,181	5,202	5,239	5,278	5,329	5,732	5,834	8,626
Labour	Paddy Dunne	5.6	2,060	2,115	2,150	2,209	2,224	2,592	2,630	3,947	4,259	4,385	4,506
Independent	Matthew Finnegan	4.1	1,508	1,676	1,764	1,771	1,832	1,872	1,914	1,988			
Fine Gael	James Kelly	3.8	1,393	1,441	1,472	1,475	1,661	1,671	1,989	2,017	2,279		
Labour	Thomas Duffy	3.3	1,230	1,271	1,305	1,385	1,402	1,677	1,692				
Fianna Fáil	Timothy Killeen	2.9	1,084	2,794	2,832	2,834	2,851	2,867	2,878	2,914	3,146	3,201	
Fine Gael	Marcus Wilson	2.0	746	769	789	791	875	883					
Fine Gael	Ray Fay	1.9	702	714	731	733							
Labour	Richard Lacy	1.8	688	712	724	741	762						
Independent	Seán Dublin Bay Rockall Loftus	1.0	364	399									
Electorate: 48,919 Valid: 37,044 Quota: 7,409 Turnout: 75.7%

=== 1965 general election ===
1965 general election: Dublin North-East
Party	Candidate	FPv%	Count									
Party	Candidate	FPv%	1	2	3	4	5	6	7	8	9	10
Fianna Fáil	Charles Haughey	23.7	12,415									
Fine Gael	Paddy Belton	17.8	9,316									
Fianna Fáil	George Colley	10.9	5,745	7,597	7,603	7,636	7,769	7,818	7,877	7,941	9,264	
Fine Gael	Patrick Byrne	9.8	5,141	5,196	5,627	6,279	6,595	6,697	8,218	8,450	8,569	8,586
Labour	Denis Larkin	9.4	4,908	5,007	5,023	5,076	5,273	5,893	6,032	8,412	8,549	8,565
Fianna Fáil	Eugene Timmons	9.3	4,902	5,719	5,723	5,750	5,855	5,887	5,936	6,033	8,077	8,561
Fianna Fáil	Stan O'Brien	5.3	2,760	3,478	3,481	3,509	3,632	3,671	3,698	3,764		
Labour	Rory Cowan	4.1	2,162	2,198	2,207	2,233	2,332	2,934	3,010			
Fine Gael	Victor Carton	2.8	1,463	1,484	1,554	1,870	1,951	1,971				
Labour	Paddy Dunne	2.6	1,385	1,407	1,412	1,424	1,505					
Independent	Seán Dublin Bay Rockall Loftus	2.2	1,151	1,178	1,181	1,192						
Fine Gael	Gordon Macaulay	2.2	1,129	1,150	1,172							
Electorate: 70,686 Valid: 52,477 Quota: 8,747 Turnout: 74.2%

=== 1963 by-election ===
Following the death of Fine Gael TD Jack Belton, a by-election was held on 30 May 1963. The seat was won by the Fine Gael candidate Paddy Belton, brother of the deceased TD.

1963 by-election: Dublin North-East
Party	Candidate	FPv%	Count		
Party	Candidate	FPv%	1	2	3
Fine Gael	Paddy Belton	41.6	16,357	17,252	21,956
Fianna Fáil	Stan O'Brien	33.4	13,132	13,652	15,358
Labour	Denis Larkin	18.5	7,270	8,071	
Independent	Seán Dublin Bay Rockall Loftus	6.4	2,526		
Electorate: 68,573 Valid: 39,285 Quota: 19,643 Turnout: 57.3%

=== 1961 general election ===
1961 general election: Dublin North-East
Party	Candidate	FPv%	Count								
Party	Candidate	FPv%	1	2	3	4	5	6	7	8	9
Fianna Fáil	Charles Haughey	20.2	8,566								
Fine Gael	Jack Belton	13.7	5,781	5,816	5,853	6,032	6,154	6,845	7,146		
Fianna Fáil	George Colley	12.0	5,086	5,758	5,783	5,880	5,997	6,038	6,267	7,219	
Fine Gael	Patrick Byrne	11.0	4,673	4,700	4,748	4,915	5,019	5,472	5,818	5,956	8,111
Fianna Fáil	Eugene Timmons	9.4	3,998	4,426	4,469	4,570	4,718	4,767	5,106	6,371	6,600
Labour	Denis Larkin	6.2	2,641	2,680	3,280	3,413	3,853	3,921	4,555	4,670	5,016
Fine Gael	Thomas Cosgrave	5.9	2,479	2,494	2,521	2,604	2,677	2,990	3,112	3,163	
Fianna Fáil	Stan O'Brien	4.9	2,062	2,278	2,291	2,391	2,508	2,537	2,637		
Independent	Peadar Cowan	4.4	1,863	1,888	1,918	2,001	2,288	2,346			
Fine Gael	Victor Carton	3.8	1,613	1,626	1,636	1,702	1,726				
Sinn Féin	Tom Mitchell	3.7	1,553	1,568	1,595	1,692					
Independent	Seán Dublin Bay Rockall Loftus	2.7	1,132	1,148	1,165						
Labour	Thomas Duffy	2.1	883	892							
Electorate: 65,429 Valid: 42,330 Quota: 7,056 Turnout: 64.7%

=== 1957 general election ===
1957 general election: Dublin North-East
Party	Candidate	FPv%	Count									
Party	Candidate	FPv%	1	2	3	4	5	6	7	8	9	10
Fianna Fáil	Oscar Traynor	24.9	10,059									
Fine Gael	Patrick Byrne	12.5	5,034	5,077	5,123	5,339	5,727	6,417	7,391			
Fianna Fáil	Charles Haughey	10.3	4,168	5,145	5,167	5,278	5,436	5,465	5,836	5,896	6,404	6,562
Labour	Denis Larkin	9.3	3,756	3,827	3,933	4,217	4,536	4,616	5,628	5,854	7,242	
Sinn Féin	Tom Mitchell	8.3	3,346	3,387	3,544	3,672	3,792	3,813	4,044	4,063		
Fine Gael	Jack Belton	6.4	2,594	2,609	2,639	2,711	2,883	4,567	4,899	5,208	5,578	5,845
Fianna Fáil	Harry Colley	6.3	2,549	4,560	4,581	4,670	4,851	4,879	5,172	5,217	5,669	5,754
Independent	Thomas Stafford	6.2	2,520	2,598	2,653	3,031	3,621	3,673				
Fine Gael	Desmond Bell	5.7	2,318	2,327	2,361	2,429	2,619					
Independent	Michael Dempsey	4.5	1,822	1,849	1,897	2,226						
Independent	Mairead McGuinness	4.1	1,640	1,681	1,744							
Clann na Poblachta	Patrick McCartan	1.4	585	599								
Electorate: 64,904 Valid: 40,391 Quota: 6,732 Turnout: 62.2%

=== 1956 by-election ===
Following the death of Independent TD Alfie Byrne, a by-election was held on 30 April 1956. The seat was won by the independent candidate Patrick Byrne, son of the deceased TD.

1956 by-election: Dublin North-East
Party	Candidate	FPv%	Count
Party	Candidate	FPv%	1
Independent	Patrick Byrne	56.5	18,129
Fianna Fáil	Charles Haughey	43.5	13,950
Electorate: 64,903 Valid: 32,079 Quota: 16,040 Turnout: 49.4%

=== 1954 general election ===
1954 general election: Dublin North-East
Party	Candidate	FPv%	Count												
Party	Candidate	FPv%	1	2	3	4	5	6	7	8	9	10	11	12	13
Independent	Alfie Byrne	22.1	10,464												
Fianna Fáil	Oscar Traynor	19.6	9,293												
Fine Gael	Jack Belton	9.7	4,606	5,219	5,228	5,315	5,635	5,862	5,969	6,373	6,424	7,722	8,168		
Labour	Denis Larkin	7.7	3,637	4,000	4,015	4,060	4,179	4,330	5,406	6,158	6,216	6,384	7,385	7,468	7,742
Fine Gael	Desmond Bell	7.7	3,632	3,920	3,926	3,996	4,202	4,393	4,476	4,756	4,786	5,392	5,629	5,768	5,899
Independent	Peadar Cowan	4.8	2,253	2,662	2,701	2,757	2,848	2,959	3,053	3,175	3,284	3,405			
Fianna Fáil	Eugene Timmons	4.5	2,135	2,216	2,610	2,636	2,662	2,791	2,842	2,922	3,844	3,891	4,364	4,383	
Fianna Fáil	Harry Colley	4.1	1,966	2,105	2,824	2,874	2,900	3,034	3,073	3,134	4,159	4,203	4,703	4,729	7,974
Fianna Fáil	Charles Haughey	3.8	1,812	1,877	2,050	2,073	2,093	2,205	2,242	2,297					
Fine Gael	Victor Carton	3.7	1,758	1,901	1,906	1,929	2,106	2,197	2,243	2,381	2,408				
Clann na Poblachta	Michael Kelly	3.2	1,529	1,594	1,600	1,626	1,660	1,894	2,058						
Labour	Jeremiah Kelly	3.0	1,438	1,557	1,563	1,611	1,643	1,771							
Independent	Séamus Murphy (Note: Ran under the National Action banner.)	3.0	1,430	1,510	1,520	1,580	1,613								
Fine Gael	Lillie O'Shea Leamy	2.0	948	1,089	1,096	1,111									
Independent	Thomas Healy	1.1	502	559	562										
Electorate: 66,197 Valid: 47,403 Quota: 7,901 Turnout: 71.6%

=== 1951 general election ===
1951 general election: Dublin North-East
Party	Candidate	FPv%	Count									
Party	Candidate	FPv%	1	2	3	4	5	6	7	8	9	10
Fianna Fáil	Oscar Traynor	28.1	13,192									
Independent	Alfie Byrne	22.1	10,397									
Fine Gael	Jack Belton	14.3	6,718	6,792	7,708	7,994						
Independent	Peadar Cowan	7.7	3,606	3,734	4,313	4,333	4,337	4,417	4,498	4,506	4,972	5,795
Fianna Fáil	Harry Colley	7.0	3,300	6,417	6,671	6,681	6,685	6,720	8,091			
Labour	Denis Larkin	6.2	2,905	2,987	3,327	3,342	3,349	4,005	4,051	4,058	4,947	5,704
Fianna Fáil	Eugene Timmons	4.2	1,967	3,112	3,201	3,212	3,217	3,274	4,073	4,315	4,879	
Fine Gael	James Trainor	3.9	1,819	1,877	2,014	2,363	2,507	2,564	2,635	2,642		
Fianna Fáil	Charles Haughey	3.5	1,629	2,340	2,424	2,429	2,430	2,454				
Labour	John Smithers	1.8	825	860	927	942	944					
Fine Gael	William Martin Murphy	1.3	603	618	722							
Electorate: 66,470 Valid: 46,961 Quota: 7,827 Turnout: 70.6%

=== 1948 general election ===
1948 general election: Dublin North-East
Party	Candidate	FPv%	Count													
Party	Candidate	FPv%	1	2	3	4	5	6	7	8	9	10	11	12	13	14
Independent	Alfie Byrne	29.3	13,066													
Fianna Fáil	Oscar Traynor	26.5	11,808													
Clann na Poblachta	Peadar Cowan	10.5	4,692	5,313	5,364	5,380	5,407	5,943	6,042	6,139	6,182	6,236	6,292	7,902		
Fine Gael	Jack Belton	7.9	3,529	5,377	5,463	5,481	5,513	5,555	5,656	5,739	5,805	5,870	6,062	6,243	6,421	7,166
Fine Gael	James Trainor	5.1	2,286	3,026	3,097	3,111	3,130	3,149	3,214	3,248	3,315	3,407	3,473	3,571	3,670	4,268
Fianna Fáil	Harry Colley	4.2	1,869	2,470	5,332	5,351	5,397	5,424	5,537	5,578	6,467	8,140				
Clann na Poblachta	Kathleen Clarke	3.2	1,419	1,827	1,872	1,876	1,894	2,107	2,189	2,240	2,268	2,301	2,397			
Fianna Fáil	John Phelan	2.3	1,034	1,236	1,645	1,654	1,672	1,680	1,713	1,748						
Labour	Archie Heron	2.3	1,009	1,292	1,312	1,410	1,435	1,448	1,548							
Labour	John Smithers	2.2	995	1,215	1,257	1,435	1,460	1,495	1,647	2,720	2,775	2,849	2,983	3,088	3,285	
Fianna Fáil	Eugene Timmons	1.9	832	983	1,676	1,689	1,707	1,723	1,773	1,786	2,217					
Clann na Poblachta	Daniel Sheridan	1.8	815	924	949	954	967									
National Labour Party	Frank Robbins	1.1	476	654	687	694	1,063	1,079								
National Labour Party	Seán O'Moore	1.0	440	630	657	663										
Labour	James Sweetman	0.7	297	384	400											
Electorate: 61,484 Valid: 44,567 Quota: 7,428 Turnout: 72.5%

=== 1944 general election ===
1944 general election: Dublin North-East
Party	Candidate	FPv%	Count					
Party	Candidate	FPv%	1	2	3	4	5	6
Fianna Fáil	Oscar Traynor	37.9	14,071					
Independent	Alfie Byrne	23.1	8,591	8,907	8,956	9,355		
Fine Gael	James Trainor	13.0	4,815	4,872	4,899	5,073	5,108	6,927
Labour	James Larkin	12.1	4,489	4,635	4,660	4,809	4,829	
Fianna Fáil	Harry Colley	10.6	3,938	8,087	8,139	8,440	8,461	9,707
National Labour Party	Michael Colgan	2.3	856	942	1,173			
National Labour Party	Frank Robbins	1.0	355	393				
Electorate: 54,377 Valid: 37,115 Quota: 9,279 Turnout: 68.3%

=== 1943 general election ===
Full figures for the second, third and fourth counts are unavailable.

1943 general election: Dublin North-East
Party	Candidate	FPv%	Count				
Party	Candidate	FPv%	1	2	3	4	5
Fianna Fáil	Oscar Traynor	33.9	13,222				
Independent	Alfie Byrne	28.9	11,293				
Labour	James Larkin	15.1	5,896	N/A	N/A	N/A	8,568
Fine Gael	Richard Mulcahy	14.7	5,733	N/A	N/A	N/A	7,813
Fianna Fáil	Harry Colley	5.9	2,287	N/A	N/A	5,835	
Córas na Poblachta	Martin Bell	1.5	581	N/A	631		
Electorate: 54,377 Valid: 39,012 Quota: 9,754 Turnout: 71.7%

=== 1938 general election ===
1938 general election: Dublin North-East
Party	Candidate	FPv%	Count			
Party	Candidate	FPv%	1	2	3	4
Fianna Fáil	Oscar Traynor	28.1	10,318			
Fine Gael	Richard Mulcahy	24.7	9,072	9,099	9,678	
Independent	Alfie Byrne	20.1	7,386	7,418	8,860	9,214
Fianna Fáil	Thomas O'Reilly	13.7	5,040	6,074	8,495	8,614
Independent	James Larkin	13.2	4,859	4,915		
Electorate: 51,618 Valid: 36,675 Quota: 9,169 Turnout: 71.1%

=== 1937 general election ===
1937 general election: Dublin North-East
Party	Candidate	FPv%	Count			
Party	Candidate	FPv%	1	2	3	4
Independent	Alfie Byrne	33.3	12,063			
Fianna Fáil	Oscar Traynor	26.8	9,693			
Independent	James Larkin	16.5	5,970	6,581	6,617	8,619
Fine Gael	Richard Mulcahy	14.3	5,192	7,403	7,411	7,722
Fianna Fáil	Thomas O'Reilly	9.1	3,285	3,475	4,073	
Electorate: 50,323 Valid: 36,203 Quota: 9,051 Turnout: 71.9%

== See also ==
- Dáil constituencies
- Politics of the Republic of Ireland
- Historic Dáil constituencies
- Elections in the Republic of Ireland
