= Dublin Artane =

Dáil constituency (1977-1981)

- Former Dáil constituency

Former constituency
- Created: 1977
- Abolished: 1981
- Seats: 3
- Local government area: Dublin City

Dublin Artane was a parliamentary constituency represented in Dáil Éireann, the lower house of the Irish parliament or Oireachtas from 1977 to 1981. The constituency elected 3 deputies (Teachtaí Dála, commonly known as TDs) to the Dáil, using proportional representation by means of the single transferable vote (PR-STV).

== History ==
The constituency was created under the terms of the Electoral (Amendment) Act 1974, largely replacing the former Dublin North-East constituency, as part of the redistribution of constituencies which attempted to secure the re-election of the outgoing Fine Gael–Labour Party government. It was only used for the 1977 general election. The constituency was abolished in 1981 with much of it going into an expanded Dublin North-Central constituency. There were 15 electoral areas in Dublin Artane; 11 went to Dublin North-Central for the 1981 general election, with two going to Dublin North-East and two to Dublin North-West.

== Boundaries ==
It covered the north eastern parts of Dublin city, including the Artane area together with parts of Clontarf, Drumcondra and Santry. It consisted of the following wards of the county borough of Dublin: Artane A, Artane B, Artane C, Artane D, Artane E, Artane F, Artane G, Artane H, Clontarf East E, Clontarf West A, Clontarf West B, Drumcondra North A, Drumcondra North B, Drumcondra North C, Santry B.

== TDs ==
Teachtaí Dála (TDs) for Dublin Artane 1977–1981
Key to parties: FF = Fianna Fáil; Ind = Independent
Dáil	Election	Deputy (Party)	Deputy (Party)	Deputy (Party)
21st	1977	Charles Haughey (FF)	Timothy Killeen (FF)	Noël Browne (Ind)
22nd	1981	Constituency abolished		

Note: The columns in this table are used only for presentational purposes, and no significance should be attached to the order of columns. For details of the order in which seats were won at each election, see the detailed results of that election.

== 1977 general election ==
*: Outgoing TD

1977 general election: Dublin Artane
Party	Candidate	FPv%	Count											
Party	Candidate	FPv%	1	2	3	4	5	6	7	8	9	10	11	12
Fianna Fáil	Charles Haughey	36.7	11,041											
Independent	Noël Browne	18.6	5,601	5,910	5,934	6,084	6,169	6,224	6,264	6,379	6,947	7,243	8,634	
Fine Gael	Paddy Belton	11.6	3,494	3,527	3,534	3,535	3,546	3,574	3,748	4,325	4,552	4,622	6,101	6,765
Labour	Paddy Dunne	9.1	2,723	2,776	2,791	2,814	2,852	3,174	3,222	3,387	3,623	3,716		
Fianna Fáil	Timothy Killeen	6.3	1,900	3,705	3,734	3,738	3,760	3,777	3,781	3,801	3,994	6,594	6,802	6,923
Fianna Fáil	Eugene Timmons	5.9	1,777	2,963	2,986	2,994	3,041	3,056	3,065	3,078	3,237			
Independent	Hannah Barlow	4.1	1,238	1,299	1,338	1,360	1,402	1,408	1,435	1,494				
Fine Gael	Brian Murray	2.2	649	658	663	664	670	688	987					
Fine Gael	James Munro	1.9	569	575	582	583	588	606						
Labour	Michael O'Halloran	1.5	461	475	479	482	486							
Independent	Philip Marsh	0.8	245	266	270	285								
Communist	Gerard McIntyre	0.8	227	233	234									
Independent	Desmond Fox	0.5	144	164										
Electorate: 39,439 Valid: 30,069 Spoilt: 222 (0.7%) Quota: 7,518 Turnout: 30,291 (76.8%)

== See also ==
- Dáil constituencies
- Politics of the Republic of Ireland
- Historic Dáil constituencies
- Elections in the Republic of Ireland
