= Dublin Clontarf =

Dublin Clontarf may refer to one of two Parliamentary constituencies in Dublin, Ireland:

- Dublin Clontarf (Dáil constituency), 1977–1981
- Dublin Clontarf (UK Parliament constituency) 1918–1922, and Dáil constituency 1918–1921
