= Peadar Cowan =

Irish politician (1903–1962)

- Cowan during his time in Clann na Poblachta

Teachta Dála
- In office February 1948 – May 1954
- Constituency: Dublin North-East

Personal details
- Born: 23 October 1903 Arvagh, County Cavan, Ireland
- Died: 9 May 1962 (aged 58)
- Party: Labour Party (c. 1937 to 1945); Vanguard Movement (1944); Clann na Poblachta; (1946 to 1948)
- Spouse: Rosemary Collumb (m. 1923)
- Children: 11
- Military service
- Allegiance: Ireland
- Service: Irish Republican Army; National Army; Defence Forces
- Service years: 1921–1931
- Rank: Captain
- Conflicts: War of Independence; Civil War

Captain Peadar Cowan (23 October 1903 – 9 May 1962) was an Irish soldier, lawyer, and politician.

== Biography ==
He joined the IRA in 1921, serving with the West Cavan Brigade during the Irish War of Independence. He joined the National Army in 1922 as a captain and served in the Irish Civil War. Because of the downsizing of the army after the civil war, he was reduced to second lieutenant. He was promoted back to captain in 1931 and resigned shortly thereafter. He changed profession and became a solicitor.

In the 1930s Cowan bounced between radical political factions, becoming a member of the radical left-wing Irish republican groups Saor Éire in 1931, and the Republican Congress in 1934. However, by the late 1930s, Cowan had switched his political outlook and joined the Labour Party. He first stood unsuccessfully for election at the 1937 general election as a Labour Party candidate for the Meath–Westmeath constituency. He also stood unsuccessfully at the 1938, 1943 and 1944 general elections in the same constituency.

=== Vanguard Movement ===
Vanguard Movement
- Leader: Peadar Cowan
- Founded: August 1944
- Dissolved: c. 1945
- Ideology: Communism; Marxist-Leninism

Following the entry of the Soviet Union into World War II, the Communist Party of Ireland in the Republic of Ireland disbanded, with its member instructed to join the Labour Party en masse. This influx of radical communists into the Labour Party lead to intense factionalism that eventually caused a split in the party, with the National Labour Party breaking off in 1944 to distance themselves from the communists. Among this in-fighting and splitting, Cowan broke also broke from the Labour Party to form his own group: In August 1944 Cowan founded a hardline Communist group known as (the) "Vanguard Movement", which led to his expulsion from the Labour Party in 1945. The group advocated the abolition of private property, the ownership by the workers and labourers of the means of production and the assimilation of Ireland into a Federation of Socialist Republics once World War II had ceased. The group also accused the Knights of St Columba of behaving like a secret Catholic society existing with undue control over Irish society. Some names associated with the group included John de Courcy Ireland, RN Tweedy and Frank Edwards.

The Vanguard's blazen communistic rhetoric quickly made the group a target for the new National Labour Party as well as the Catholic Church. With the prospects of growth for the group slim, it was not long before Cowan had moved on from them.

=== Dáil Éireann ===
In 1946 he joined the newly formed Clann na Poblachta, where he became the party's first treasurer. He was first elected to Dáil Éireann at the 1948 general election as a Clann na Poblachta Teachta Dála (TD) for the Dublin North-East constituency. He was expelled from the party in July 1948, after he criticised Ireland's receipt of aid from the Marshall Plan negotiated by party leader Seán MacBride as Minister for External Affairs.

During Cowan's time in the Dáil, he was constantly needled by other TDs about his time in the Vanguard, with Seán MacEntee in particular using speaking time in the Dáil to pepper Cowan about his communist statements as Vanguard's leader.

Cowan supported Noël Browne over the Mother and Child Scheme and stood again as an Independent candidate at the 1951 general election where he retained his seat. He was defeated at the 1954 general election.

During Cowan's time as a TD, he continued to work in his capacity as a solicitor. It was during this period that Cowan represented (pro bono) the family of a young Eamon Dunphy who were faced with eviction. Cowan was able to prevent the eviction and Dunphy would later recount the episode in an autobiography.

=== Imprisonment ===
In 1956 Cowan declared himself bankrupt. On 1 November 1957 Cowan was convicted of embezzling £3,705 from a bricklayer, James O'Reilly and was sentenced to 2 years of prison. After an appeal to the Supreme Court failed, Cowan was struck off the roll of solicitors by the chief justice on 31 October 1958. Following his release from prison, Cowan would write the book Dungeons Deep, which discussed the state of Ireland's prison system.

=== Return to politics ===
In the 1960 local elections Cowan was re-elected to Dublin City Council. The last eliminated candidate, Victor Carton, petitioned that High Court that Cowan was ineligible due to being bankrupted and having been sentenced to two years' hard labour within five years of the election. The petition would have been tried under the Municipal Corporations Act 1882, but in 1961 the High Court struck out the 1882 act as incompatible with the 1937 constitution, so that Cowan kept his seat. Cowan was an unsuccessful candidate at the 1961 general election.

=== Death ===
Cowan died on 7 May 1962 in Dublin, leaving an estate valued at £5. Cowan married Rosemary Collumb in 1923, and they had seven sons and four daughters. One of those sons, Rory Cowan, unsuccessfully contested the Dublin North-East constituency for the Labour party in 1965. Rory's son is the actor Rory Cowan.

Dáil	Election	Deputy (Party)	Deputy (Party)	Deputy (Party)	Deputy (Party)	Deputy (Party)
9th	1937	Alfie Byrne (Ind.)	Oscar Traynor (FF)	James Larkin (Ind.)	3 seats 1937–1948	
10th	1938	Alfie Byrne (Ind.)	Oscar Traynor (FF)	Richard Mulcahy (FG)	3 seats 1937–1948	
11th	1943	Alfie Byrne (Ind.)	Oscar Traynor (FF)	James Larkin (Lab)	3 seats 1937–1948	
12th	1944	Alfie Byrne (Ind.)	Oscar Traynor (FF)	Harry Colley (FF)	3 seats 1937–1948	
13th	1948	Alfie Byrne (Ind.)	Oscar Traynor (FF)	Harry Colley (FF)	Jack Belton (FG)	Peadar Cowan (CnaP)
14th	1951	Alfie Byrne (Ind.)	Oscar Traynor (FF)	Harry Colley (FF)	Jack Belton (FG)	Peadar Cowan (Ind.)
15th	1954	Alfie Byrne (Ind.)	Oscar Traynor (FF)	Harry Colley (FF)	Jack Belton (FG)	Denis Larkin (Lab)
15th	1956 by-election	Patrick Byrne (FG)	Oscar Traynor (FF)	Harry Colley (FF)	Jack Belton (FG)	Denis Larkin (Lab)
16th	1957	Patrick Byrne (FG)	Oscar Traynor (FF)	Charles Haughey (FF)	Jack Belton (FG)	Denis Larkin (Lab)
17th	1961	Patrick Byrne (FG)	George Colley (FF)	Charles Haughey (FF)	Jack Belton (FG)	Eugene Timmons (FF)
17th	1963 by-election	Patrick Byrne (FG)	George Colley (FF)	Charles Haughey (FF)	Paddy Belton (FG)	Eugene Timmons (FF)
18th	1965	Patrick Byrne (FG)	George Colley (FF)	Charles Haughey (FF)	Paddy Belton (FG)	Denis Larkin (Lab)
19th	1969	Conor Cruise O'Brien (Lab)	Eugene Timmons (FF)	Charles Haughey (FF)	Paddy Belton (FG)	4 seats 1969–1977
20th	1973	Conor Cruise O'Brien (Lab)	Eugene Timmons (FF)	Charles Haughey (FF)	Paddy Belton (FG)	4 seats 1969–1977
21st	1977	Constituency abolished				

Dáil	Election	Deputy (Party)	Deputy (Party)	Deputy (Party)	Deputy (Party)
22nd	1981	Michael Woods (FF)	Liam Fitzgerald (FF)	Seán Dublin Bay Rockall Loftus (Ind.)	Michael Joe Cosgrave (FG)
23rd	1982 (Feb)	Michael Woods (FF)	Maurice Manning (FG)	Ned Brennan (FF)	Michael Joe Cosgrave (FG)
24th	1982 (Nov)	Michael Woods (FF)	Maurice Manning (FG)	Liam Fitzgerald (FF)	Michael Joe Cosgrave (FG)
25th	1987	Michael Woods (FF)	Pat McCartan (WP)	Liam Fitzgerald (FF)	Michael Joe Cosgrave (FG)
26th	1989	Michael Woods (FF)	Pat McCartan (WP)	Liam Fitzgerald (FF)	Michael Joe Cosgrave (FG)
27th	1992	Michael Woods (FF)	Tommy Broughan (Lab)	Liam Fitzgerald (FF)	Seán Kenny (Lab)
28th	1997	Michael Woods (FF)	Tommy Broughan (Lab)	Martin Brady (FF)	Michael Joe Cosgrave (FG)
29th	2002	Michael Woods (FF)	Tommy Broughan (Lab)	Martin Brady (FF)	3 seats from 2002
30th	2007	Michael Woods (FF)	Tommy Broughan (Lab)	Terence Flanagan (FG)	3 seats from 2002
31st	2011	Seán Kenny (Lab)	Tommy Broughan (Lab)	Terence Flanagan (FG)	3 seats from 2002
32nd	2016	Constituency abolished. See Dublin Bay North			
