= Timothy Killeen =

Timothy Killeen may refer to:

- Timothy L. Killeen, U.S. scientist and professor
- Timothy Killeen (politician) (1923–1993), Irish Fianna Fáil politician
