= Frank Robbins (trade unionist) =

Irish trade unionists (1895–1979)

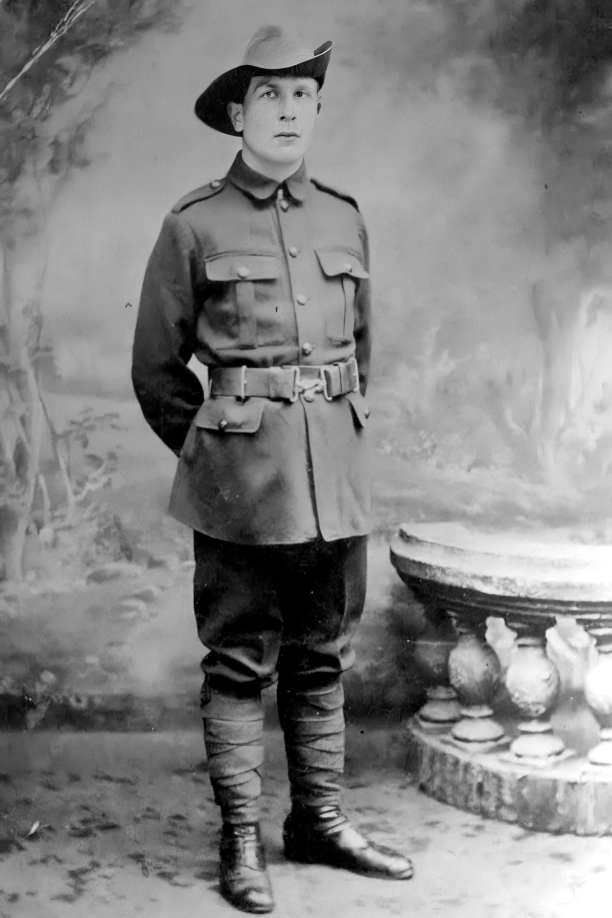
- Robbins in his Irish Citizen Army uniform, c. 1914

Personal details
- Born: Francis Robbins; 5 July 1895
- Died: 31 January 1979 (aged 83)
- Party: Labour Party
- Other political affiliations: National Labour Party
- Occupation: Trade Unionist

Military service
- Branch/service: Irish Citizen Army
- Rank: Captain
- Battles/wars: Easter Rising

Frank Robbins (5 July 1895 – 31 January 1979) was an Irish trade unionist. Robbins came to prominence as a member of James Connolly's Irish Citizen Army, taking part in the Dublin Lockout in 1913 and the Easter Rising in 1916. Although Robbins did not involve himself in the ensuing Irish War of Independence or Irish Civil War, he continued to influence events in Ireland through his leadership in the trade union movement and as part of the Labour Party. During the Irish revolutionary period, Robbins was frustrated by the notion that Labour was considered outside of Irish Republicanism, rather than a strand within it. He was also frustrated by the lack of willingness by the labour movement to involve itself directly in the War of Independence.

Although Robbins was a disciple of the syndicalist Connolly, he himself rejected communism and hardline socialism, to the point that in 1944 he followed William O'Brien and his supporters out of the Labour party and into the splinter group the National Labour Party when they accused the mainline of the party of allowing communists such as Jim Larkin into the Dublin branches of the party.

== Biography ==
Born Francis Robbins to William and Mary Robbons, "Frank" was the fifth of nine siblings brought up at 3 Upper Buckingham Street, Dublin. At age 13, he began working at Barrington's soap works before moving to a job on Dublin's dockyards. In 1911, he joined the Irish Transport and General Workers' Union, which would lead to his participation in the Dublin Lockout of 1913, a mass strike by trade unions members in Dublin which ended up lasting six months. Robbin's participating in the Lockdown led to him joining James Connolly's Irish Citizen Army, a paramilitary group initially formed to defend striking workers.

In 1916, as part of the ICA, Robbins participated in the Easter Rising, when Irish republicans and socialists staged a rebellion against the United Kingdom in Dublin. Robbin was a part of the St Stephen's Green garrison, which occupied the College of Surgeons. In the aftermath Robbins was arrested and then interned at Knutsford detention barracks and then at Frongoch internment camp, both in Great Britain.

Following his release in August 1916, Robbins procured a job on a transatlantic cargo ship. Soon, the ITGWU asked Robbins to go to the United States to ask James Larkin, the high-profile Irish labour leader, to return to Ireland. Larkin had left Ireland following the defeat of the Dublin Lockout. Robbins ended up remaining in the States for a year, becoming closely associated with John Devoy of Clan na Gael and Liam Mellows, who had also been involved in the Easter Rising and fled to America in the aftermath. Robbins and Devoy would form a lasting bond, and ten years after Devoy's death in 1938, Robbins would return to New York to personally bring Devoy's papers back to Ireland.

In 1918, Robbins returned to Ireland, where he set about trying to bring the Irish Volunteers and the Irish Citizen Army together. When the Irish War of Independence broke out, the much-depleted ICA did not participate. Nor did it participate in the Irish Civil War; alongside the Labour party it declared itself "Neutral" on the issue of the Anglo-Irish treaty. However, upon the assassination of Michael Collins in August 1922, Robbins gave serious consideration to joining the National Army. Robbins was highly critical of the lack of role played by the ICA in the War of Independence, stating:

It can be claimed with some justification that the trade union movement itself as well as individual trade unionists in their roles as members of the Volunteers to some extent made up for the abysmal failure of the Irish Citizen Army to play a significant role on behalf of the working class in the shaping of Irish independence during the crucial years of 1918 to 1921

In 1922, Robbins became an officer in the ITGWU, which became his primary focus. In 1931, he became secretary of the no. 7 branch of the ITGWU, a position he held until his retirement in 1960.

Robbins was considered to be on the "right" of the Labour movement in Ireland. Like William O'Brien, Robbins opposed the influence of Jim Larkin. Robbins also vocally opposed support for communism amongst Irish labour. In 1943, Robbins supported O'Brien when O'Brien lead the ITGWU to disaffiliate from the Labour party, opting instead to create their own party the National Labour Party. Robbins himself stood on behalf of the National Labour party in the 1944 general election and 1948 general election as a candidate in Dublin North-East. In 1945, Robbins helped create the Congress of Irish Unions after the ITGWU disaffiliated from the Irish Trades Union Congress because of its decision to send delegates to the World Federation of Trade Unions in London. O'Brien and Robbins maintained that the WFTU was dominated by Communists. Still an Irish nationalist, Robbins opposed the presence of British trade unions in Ireland. In 1956, Robbins became president of Dublin Council of Irish Unions, a split from the Dublin Council of Trade Unions. The two groups reunited in 1960, and Robbins had no involvement thereafter. In the 1950s, Robbins was also a director of Mianraí Teoranta, a semi-state mining company based in County Tipperary. In 1959, Robbins became a director of Irish Shipping Ltd.

In 1977, Robbins released his account of the history of the Irish Citizen Army in a book entitled "Under the Starry Plough".

Robbins died on 31 January 1979. He was predeceased by his wife and was survived by four children.
