= Thomas Stafford (Irish politician) =

Irish politician (1916–1995

Lord Mayor of Dublin
- In office 1967–1968
- Preceded by: Eugene Timmons
- Succeeded by: Frank Cluskey

Personal details
- Born: c.1916 Gorey, County Wexford, Ireland
- Died: 28 January 1995 Dublin, Ireland
- Party: Fianna Fáil
- Children: 8, including John

Thomas Stafford (c.1916 – 28 January 1995) was an Irish Fianna Fáil politician. He was a member of Dublin Corporation from 1955 to 1979, and served as Lord Mayor of Dublin from 1967 to 1968.

He was born in Gorey, County Wexford, and moved to Dublin at the age of 15. He later founded T. Stafford & Sons funeral directors in North Strand.

He was an unsuccessful independent candidate for the Dublin North-East constituency at the 1957 general election, and for the Dublin North-Central constituency at the 1961 general election. In 1969 he joined Fianna Fáil, and was an unsuccessful Fianna Fáil candidate for Dublin North-Central at the 1969 general election.

In September 1988, the Lord Mayor, Ben Briscoe, presented awards to his surviving predecessors to mark the city's millennium, including Stafford.

He was married and had eight children. Two of his five sons, Tom and John Stafford, also served on Dublin City Council, with John holding the office of Lord Mayor from 1997 to 1998. John was a Fianna Fáil TD.

Thomas Stafford died on 28 January 1995 at the age of 79.

Civic offices
Preceded by Eugene Timmons	Lord Mayor of Dublin; 1967–1968	Succeeded by Frank Cluskey
