= Maurice Manning =

Irish academic and former politician (born 1943)

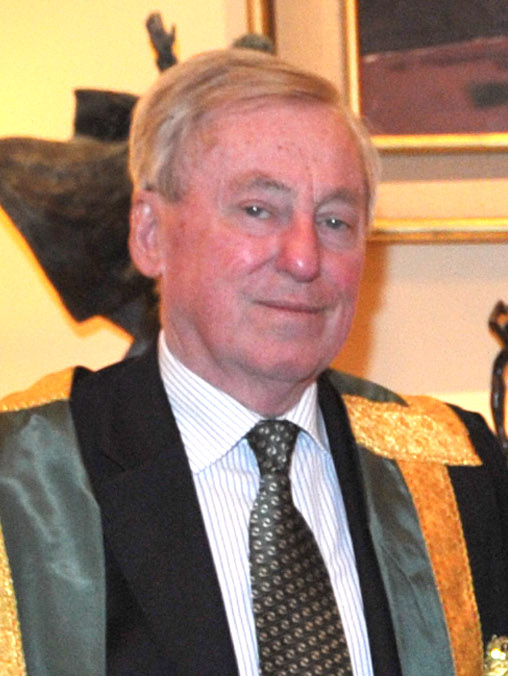
- Manning in 2014

Senator
- In office 25 April 1987 – 12 September 2002
- In office 8 October 1981 – 18 February 1982
- Constituency: Cultural and Educational Panel

Teachta Dála
- In office February 1982 – February 1987
- Constituency: Dublin North-East

Personal details
- Born: 14 June 1943 (age 83) Bagenalstown, County Carlow, Ireland
- Party: Fine Gael
- Education: University College Dublin; University of Strathclyde

Maurice Manning (born 14 June 1943) is an Irish academic and former Fine Gael politician. Manning was a member of the Oireachtas for 21 years, serving in both the Dáil and the Seanad. On 12 March 2009 he was elected Chancellor of the National University of Ireland, while remaining president of the Human Rights Commission. From 2002 to 2014, he was president of the Irish Human Rights Commission.

== Early life ==
Manning was born in Bagenalstown, County Carlow, and educated at Presentation De La Salle College there. He attended Rockwell College, University College Dublin (UCD) and the University of Strathclyde. He earned a BA and MA from UCD, which in 2000 awarded him a DLitt. An academic by background, Manning previously lectured in the politics department of UCD. He is a member of the Senate of the National University of Ireland and of the Governing Authority of UCD, and was a member of the Governing Authority of the European University Institute at Florence. He has written several books on modern Irish politics, including a biography of James Dillon, a political novel and a history of the Blueshirts movement.

== Political career ==
Manning first stood for election in 1979 as a Fine Gael candidate for the Dublin constituency at the first European Parliament election, when he did not win a seat. He was unsuccessful again when he stood at the 1981 general election in the Dublin North-East constituency, but was then elected on the Cultural and Educational Panel to the 15th Seanad.

At the February 1982 Dáil election he stood again in Dublin North-East, winning a seat in the 23rd Dáil Éireann. He retained his seat at the November 1982 general election, but was defeated at the 1987 general election. He stood again in Dublin North-East at the 1989 general election, and in Dublin South at the 1992 general election but never returned to the Dáil.

After his 1987 defeat he was elected to the 18th Seanad, again on the Cultural and Educational Panel, and was re-elected three more times until he did not contest the 2002 election to the 22nd Seanad, when Fine Gael chose not to nominate him. After the 2002 general election Manning had initially announced his intention to stand down, but when Enda Kenny was elected as party leader, he stayed on. However following the loss of 20 Dáil seats in 2002, the party's nominating committee chose to prioritise candidates who could challenge for Dáil seats at the next election, and he was not nominated. It was reported that this may have been related to a dispute with the Fine Gael Chairman, Senator Pádraic McCormack, whom Manning had threatened to challenge for the chairmanship.

In the early 1980s Manning was a member of the New Ireland Forum and later of the British–Irish Parliamentary Assembly. He served as Leader of the Seanad from 1995 to 1997, and as Leader of the Opposition in the Seanad from 1997 to 2002.

== Human Rights Commission ==
As president of the Irish Human Rights Commission (IHRC), he represented it from October 2006 in two successive two-year terms when the IHRC has chaired the European Group of National Human Rights Institutions. The IHRC has also represented the European Group within the Bureau of the Global Alliance of National Human Rights Institutions, the global network of NHRIs closely associated with the Office of the United Nations High Commissioner for Human Rights. In 2012, with plans announced to merge the IHRC with the Equality Authority, it was expected that Manning would be appointed as the first head of the Irish Human Rights and Equality Commission; however, he did not receive that appointment.

Academic offices
Preceded by Garret FitzGerald	Chancellor of the National University of Ireland; 2009–present	Incumbent

Dáil	Election	Deputy (Party)	Deputy (Party)	Deputy (Party)	Deputy (Party)	Deputy (Party)
9th	1937	Alfie Byrne (Ind.)	Oscar Traynor (FF)	James Larkin (Ind.)	3 seats 1937–1948	
10th	1938	Alfie Byrne (Ind.)	Oscar Traynor (FF)	Richard Mulcahy (FG)	3 seats 1937–1948	
11th	1943	Alfie Byrne (Ind.)	Oscar Traynor (FF)	James Larkin (Lab)	3 seats 1937–1948	
12th	1944	Alfie Byrne (Ind.)	Oscar Traynor (FF)	Harry Colley (FF)	3 seats 1937–1948	
13th	1948	Alfie Byrne (Ind.)	Oscar Traynor (FF)	Harry Colley (FF)	Jack Belton (FG)	Peadar Cowan (CnaP)
14th	1951	Alfie Byrne (Ind.)	Oscar Traynor (FF)	Harry Colley (FF)	Jack Belton (FG)	Peadar Cowan (Ind.)
15th	1954	Alfie Byrne (Ind.)	Oscar Traynor (FF)	Harry Colley (FF)	Jack Belton (FG)	Denis Larkin (Lab)
15th	1956 by-election	Patrick Byrne (FG)	Oscar Traynor (FF)	Harry Colley (FF)	Jack Belton (FG)	Denis Larkin (Lab)
16th	1957	Patrick Byrne (FG)	Oscar Traynor (FF)	Charles Haughey (FF)	Jack Belton (FG)	Denis Larkin (Lab)
17th	1961	Patrick Byrne (FG)	George Colley (FF)	Charles Haughey (FF)	Jack Belton (FG)	Eugene Timmons (FF)
17th	1963 by-election	Patrick Byrne (FG)	George Colley (FF)	Charles Haughey (FF)	Paddy Belton (FG)	Eugene Timmons (FF)
18th	1965	Patrick Byrne (FG)	George Colley (FF)	Charles Haughey (FF)	Paddy Belton (FG)	Denis Larkin (Lab)
19th	1969	Conor Cruise O'Brien (Lab)	Eugene Timmons (FF)	Charles Haughey (FF)	Paddy Belton (FG)	4 seats 1969–1977
20th	1973	Conor Cruise O'Brien (Lab)	Eugene Timmons (FF)	Charles Haughey (FF)	Paddy Belton (FG)	4 seats 1969–1977
21st	1977	Constituency abolished				

Dáil	Election	Deputy (Party)	Deputy (Party)	Deputy (Party)	Deputy (Party)
22nd	1981	Michael Woods (FF)	Liam Fitzgerald (FF)	Seán Dublin Bay Rockall Loftus (Ind.)	Michael Joe Cosgrave (FG)
23rd	1982 (Feb)	Michael Woods (FF)	Maurice Manning (FG)	Ned Brennan (FF)	Michael Joe Cosgrave (FG)
24th	1982 (Nov)	Michael Woods (FF)	Maurice Manning (FG)	Liam Fitzgerald (FF)	Michael Joe Cosgrave (FG)
25th	1987	Michael Woods (FF)	Pat McCartan (WP)	Liam Fitzgerald (FF)	Michael Joe Cosgrave (FG)
26th	1989	Michael Woods (FF)	Pat McCartan (WP)	Liam Fitzgerald (FF)	Michael Joe Cosgrave (FG)
27th	1992	Michael Woods (FF)	Tommy Broughan (Lab)	Liam Fitzgerald (FF)	Seán Kenny (Lab)
28th	1997	Michael Woods (FF)	Tommy Broughan (Lab)	Martin Brady (FF)	Michael Joe Cosgrave (FG)
29th	2002	Michael Woods (FF)	Tommy Broughan (Lab)	Martin Brady (FF)	3 seats from 2002
30th	2007	Michael Woods (FF)	Tommy Broughan (Lab)	Terence Flanagan (FG)	3 seats from 2002
31st	2011	Seán Kenny (Lab)	Tommy Broughan (Lab)	Terence Flanagan (FG)	3 seats from 2002
32nd	2016	Constituency abolished. See Dublin Bay North			
