= Liam Fitzgerald =

Irish politician (1949–2025)

Senator
- In office 17 September 1997 – 13 September 2007
- Constituency: Labour Panel

Teachta Dála
- In office November 1982 – June 1997
- In office June 1981 – February 1982
- Constituency: Dublin North-East

Personal details
- Born: 1 September 1949 Doon, County Limerick, Ireland
- Died: 11 June 2025 (aged 75) Raheny, Dublin, Ireland
- Party: Fianna Fáil
- Education: St Patrick's College, Dublin; University College Dublin
- Occupation: Teacher

Liam Joseph Fitzgerald (1 September 1949 – 11 June 2025) was an Irish Fianna Fáil politician.

== Life and career ==
Fitzgerald was born in Doon, County Limerick and educated at the Christian Brothers school in Doon, St Patrick's College, Dublin and University College Dublin. He worked as a teacher before becoming involved in politics.

He was elected to Dáil Éireann at the 1981 general election as a Fianna Fáil TD for the Dublin North-East constituency. He lost his seat at the February 1982 election but regained it in the November 1982 election.

In 1991, he was a key member of the so-called "gang of four" that proposed a motion of no confidence in the Taoiseach and leader of Fitzgerald's party, Charles Haughey (the other members of the group were Noel Dempsey, Seán Power and M. J. Nolan). Haughey resigned in early 1992 and Albert Reynolds became Taoiseach, but Fitzgerald remained on the backbenches. He lost his Dáil seat again at the 1997 general election, but was then elected to the 21st Seanad by the Labour Panel; he was re-elected in 2002 to the 22nd Seanad.

Fitzgerald resigned the party whip on 27 March 2007, and stated his intention to run as an independent candidate in the next general election. It has been said that he did this as a response to the cancellation of the candidate selection convention in Dublin North-East. However, he did not stand at the 2007 general election.

Fitzgerald died on 11 June 2025, at the age of 75.

Dáil	Election	Deputy (Party)	Deputy (Party)	Deputy (Party)	Deputy (Party)	Deputy (Party)
9th	1937	Alfie Byrne (Ind.)	Oscar Traynor (FF)	James Larkin (Ind.)	3 seats 1937–1948	
10th	1938	Alfie Byrne (Ind.)	Oscar Traynor (FF)	Richard Mulcahy (FG)	3 seats 1937–1948	
11th	1943	Alfie Byrne (Ind.)	Oscar Traynor (FF)	James Larkin (Lab)	3 seats 1937–1948	
12th	1944	Alfie Byrne (Ind.)	Oscar Traynor (FF)	Harry Colley (FF)	3 seats 1937–1948	
13th	1948	Alfie Byrne (Ind.)	Oscar Traynor (FF)	Harry Colley (FF)	Jack Belton (FG)	Peadar Cowan (CnaP)
14th	1951	Alfie Byrne (Ind.)	Oscar Traynor (FF)	Harry Colley (FF)	Jack Belton (FG)	Peadar Cowan (Ind.)
15th	1954	Alfie Byrne (Ind.)	Oscar Traynor (FF)	Harry Colley (FF)	Jack Belton (FG)	Denis Larkin (Lab)
15th	1956 by-election	Patrick Byrne (FG)	Oscar Traynor (FF)	Harry Colley (FF)	Jack Belton (FG)	Denis Larkin (Lab)
16th	1957	Patrick Byrne (FG)	Oscar Traynor (FF)	Charles Haughey (FF)	Jack Belton (FG)	Denis Larkin (Lab)
17th	1961	Patrick Byrne (FG)	George Colley (FF)	Charles Haughey (FF)	Jack Belton (FG)	Eugene Timmons (FF)
17th	1963 by-election	Patrick Byrne (FG)	George Colley (FF)	Charles Haughey (FF)	Paddy Belton (FG)	Eugene Timmons (FF)
18th	1965	Patrick Byrne (FG)	George Colley (FF)	Charles Haughey (FF)	Paddy Belton (FG)	Denis Larkin (Lab)
19th	1969	Conor Cruise O'Brien (Lab)	Eugene Timmons (FF)	Charles Haughey (FF)	Paddy Belton (FG)	4 seats 1969–1977
20th	1973	Conor Cruise O'Brien (Lab)	Eugene Timmons (FF)	Charles Haughey (FF)	Paddy Belton (FG)	4 seats 1969–1977
21st	1977	Constituency abolished				

Dáil	Election	Deputy (Party)	Deputy (Party)	Deputy (Party)	Deputy (Party)
22nd	1981	Michael Woods (FF)	Liam Fitzgerald (FF)	Seán Dublin Bay Rockall Loftus (Ind.)	Michael Joe Cosgrave (FG)
23rd	1982 (Feb)	Michael Woods (FF)	Maurice Manning (FG)	Ned Brennan (FF)	Michael Joe Cosgrave (FG)
24th	1982 (Nov)	Michael Woods (FF)	Maurice Manning (FG)	Liam Fitzgerald (FF)	Michael Joe Cosgrave (FG)
25th	1987	Michael Woods (FF)	Pat McCartan (WP)	Liam Fitzgerald (FF)	Michael Joe Cosgrave (FG)
26th	1989	Michael Woods (FF)	Pat McCartan (WP)	Liam Fitzgerald (FF)	Michael Joe Cosgrave (FG)
27th	1992	Michael Woods (FF)	Tommy Broughan (Lab)	Liam Fitzgerald (FF)	Seán Kenny (Lab)
28th	1997	Michael Woods (FF)	Tommy Broughan (Lab)	Martin Brady (FF)	Michael Joe Cosgrave (FG)
29th	2002	Michael Woods (FF)	Tommy Broughan (Lab)	Martin Brady (FF)	3 seats from 2002
30th	2007	Michael Woods (FF)	Tommy Broughan (Lab)	Terence Flanagan (FG)	3 seats from 2002
31st	2011	Seán Kenny (Lab)	Tommy Broughan (Lab)	Terence Flanagan (FG)	3 seats from 2002
32nd	2016	Constituency abolished. See Dublin Bay North			
