= Michael Donnelly (politician) =

Irish politician

Senator
- In office 7 December 1977 – 8 October 1981
- Constituency: Administrative Panel

Lord Mayor of Dublin
- In office June 1990 – June 1991
- Preceded by: Seán Haughey
- Succeeded by: Seán Kenny

Personal details
- Party: Fianna Fáil

Michael Patrick Donnelly was an Irish Fianna Fáil politician, who was a member of Seanad Éireann from 1977 to 1981. He was elected to the Seanad by the Administrative Panel on 7 December 1977, in a by-election caused by the death of Jack Garrett.

An accountant Donnelly was first elected to Dublin City Council in 1985 and remained a member until he lost his seat in 2009. From 1990 to 1991 he held the office of Lord Mayor of Dublin. His son, Daniel, was an unsuccessful Fianna Fáil candidate in the 2014 local elections.

He is a descendant of Eamon Donnelly a chief organiser for Sinn Féin and later Fianna Fáil and subsequently a Teachta Dála (TD) for Leix–Offaly from 1933 to 1937.

Civic offices
| Preceded by Seán Haughey | Lord Mayor of Dublin; 1990–1991 | Succeeded by Seán Kenny |
