= Seán Kenny (politician) =

Irish former politician (born 1942

Teachta Dála
- In office February 2011 – February 2016
- In office November 1992 – June 1997
- Constituency: Dublin North-East

Lord Mayor of Dublin
- In office 1 May 1991 – 4 June 1992
- Preceded by: Michael Donnelly
- Succeeded by: Gay Mitchell

Personal details
- Born: 1 October 1942 (age 83) Galway, Ireland
- Party: Labour Party
- Education: University College Galway

Seán Kenny (born 1 October 1942) is an Irish former Labour Party politician who served as a Teachta Dála (TD) for the Dublin North-East constituency from 1992 to 1997 and 2011 to 2016. He also served as Lord Mayor of Dublin from 1991 to 1992.

A former executive officer in CIÉ, Kenny was elected to Dáil Éireann for Dublin North-East during the swing to Labour in the 1992 general election. During his time in the Dáil, he was a member of the Forum for Peace and Reconciliation and served as Chairman of the Social Affairs Committee.

Like many other Labour TDs elected in 1992, he lost his seat at the 1997 general election. Kenny had previously unsuccessfully contested every general election from 1981 to 1989. He did not contest the 2002 general election or the 2007 general election.

From 1979 to 2011, he was a member of Dublin City Council as a local councillor for Donaghmede. He was Lord Mayor of Dublin from 1991 to 1992.

Kenny was re-elected to Dáil Éireann for Dublin North-East at the 2011 general election, but did not contest the 2016 general election.

Civic offices
| Preceded by Michael Donnelly | Lord Mayor of Dublin; 1991–1992 | Succeeded by Gay Mitchell |

| Dáil | Election | Deputy (Party) | Deputy (Party) | Deputy (Party) | Deputy (Party) | Deputy (Party) |
|---|---|---|---|---|---|---|
| 9th | 1937 | Alfie Byrne (Ind.) | Oscar Traynor (FF) | James Larkin (Ind.) | 3 seats 1937–1948 | |
| 10th | 1938 | Alfie Byrne (Ind.) | Oscar Traynor (FF) | Richard Mulcahy (FG) | 3 seats 1937–1948 | |
| 11th | 1943 | Alfie Byrne (Ind.) | Oscar Traynor (FF) | James Larkin (Lab) | 3 seats 1937–1948 | |
| 12th | 1944 | Alfie Byrne (Ind.) | Oscar Traynor (FF) | Harry Colley (FF) | 3 seats 1937–1948 | |
| 13th | 1948 | Alfie Byrne (Ind.) | Oscar Traynor (FF) | Harry Colley (FF) | Jack Belton (FG) | Peadar Cowan (CnaP) |
| 14th | 1951 | Alfie Byrne (Ind.) | Oscar Traynor (FF) | Harry Colley (FF) | Jack Belton (FG) | Peadar Cowan (Ind.) |
| 15th | 1954 | Alfie Byrne (Ind.) | Oscar Traynor (FF) | Harry Colley (FF) | Jack Belton (FG) | Denis Larkin (Lab) |
| 15th | 1956 by-election | Patrick Byrne (FG) | Oscar Traynor (FF) | Harry Colley (FF) | Jack Belton (FG) | Denis Larkin (Lab) |
| 16th | 1957 | Patrick Byrne (FG) | Oscar Traynor (FF) | Charles Haughey (FF) | Jack Belton (FG) | Denis Larkin (Lab) |
| 17th | 1961 | Patrick Byrne (FG) | George Colley (FF) | Charles Haughey (FF) | Jack Belton (FG) | Eugene Timmons (FF) |
| 17th | 1963 by-election | Patrick Byrne (FG) | George Colley (FF) | Charles Haughey (FF) | Paddy Belton (FG) | Eugene Timmons (FF) |
| 18th | 1965 | Patrick Byrne (FG) | George Colley (FF) | Charles Haughey (FF) | Paddy Belton (FG) | Denis Larkin (Lab) |
| 19th | 1969 | Conor Cruise O'Brien (Lab) | Eugene Timmons (FF) | Charles Haughey (FF) | Paddy Belton (FG) | 4 seats 1969–1977 |
| 20th | 1973 | Conor Cruise O'Brien (Lab) | Eugene Timmons (FF) | Charles Haughey (FF) | Paddy Belton (FG) | 4 seats 1969–1977 |
| 21st | 1977 | Constituency abolished | | | | |

| Dáil | Election | Deputy (Party) | Deputy (Party) | Deputy (Party) | Deputy (Party) |
|---|---|---|---|---|---|
| 22nd | 1981 | Michael Woods (FF) | Liam Fitzgerald (FF) | Seán Dublin Bay Rockall Loftus (Ind.) | Michael Joe Cosgrave (FG) |
| 23rd | 1982 (Feb) | Michael Woods (FF) | Maurice Manning (FG) | Ned Brennan (FF) | Michael Joe Cosgrave (FG) |
| 24th | 1982 (Nov) | Michael Woods (FF) | Maurice Manning (FG) | Liam Fitzgerald (FF) | Michael Joe Cosgrave (FG) |
| 25th | 1987 | Michael Woods (FF) | Pat McCartan (WP) | Liam Fitzgerald (FF) | Michael Joe Cosgrave (FG) |
| 26th | 1989 | Michael Woods (FF) | Pat McCartan (WP) | Liam Fitzgerald (FF) | Michael Joe Cosgrave (FG) |
| 27th | 1992 | Michael Woods (FF) | Tommy Broughan (Lab) | Liam Fitzgerald (FF) | Seán Kenny (Lab) |
| 28th | 1997 | Michael Woods (FF) | Tommy Broughan (Lab) | Martin Brady (FF) | Michael Joe Cosgrave (FG) |
| 29th | 2002 | Michael Woods (FF) | Tommy Broughan (Lab) | Martin Brady (FF) | 3 seats from 2002 |
| 30th | 2007 | Michael Woods (FF) | Tommy Broughan (Lab) | Terence Flanagan (FG) | 3 seats from 2002 |
| 31st | 2011 | Seán Kenny (Lab) | Tommy Broughan (Lab) | Terence Flanagan (FG) | 3 seats from 2002 |
| 32nd | 2016 | Constituency abolished. See Dublin Bay North | | | |
