= Dublin Clontarf (Dáil constituency) =

Dáil constituency (1977–1981)

- Former Dáil constituency

Former constituency
- Created: 1977
- Abolished: 1981
- Seats: 3
- Local government area: Dublin City

Dublin Clontarf was a parliamentary constituency represented in Dáil Éireann, the lower house of the Irish parliament or Oireachtas from 1977 to 1981. The constituency elected 3 deputies (Teachtaí Dála, commonly known as TDs) to the Dáil, using proportional representation by means of the single transferable vote (PR-STV).

== History and boundaries ==
A similarly named constituency existed from 1918 to 1922, for elections of the House of Commons of the United Kingdom, but the Member of Parliament elected in 1918, Richard Mulcahy, chose not to take his seat at Westminster, and joined the revolutionary First Dáil.

The Dáil constituency was created by the Electoral (Amendment) Act 1974, and used at the 1977 general election. It consisted of the Baldoyle, Clontarf, Coolock and Raheny areas of North Dublin. The constituency was abolished in 1981.

== TDs ==
Teachtaí Dála (TDs) for Dublin Clontarf 1977–1981
Key to parties: FF = Fianna Fáil; FG = Fine Gael
Dáil	Election	Deputy (Party)	Deputy (Party)	Deputy (Party)
21st	1977	George Colley (FF)	Michael Woods (FF)	Michael Joe Cosgrave (FG)
22nd	1981	Constituency abolished		

Note: The columns in this table are used only for presentational purposes, and no significance should be attached to the order of columns. For details of the order in which seats were won at each election, see the detailed results of that election.

== 1977 general election ==
*: Outgoing TD

1977 general election: Dublin Clontarf
Party	Candidate	FPv%	Count									
Party	Candidate	FPv%	1	2	3	4	5	6	7	8	9	10
Fianna Fáil	George Colley	28.3	8,768									
Fine Gael	Michael Joe Cosgrave	12.9	3,991	4,007	4,012	4,072	4,220	4,302	4,351	4,562	6,548	7,662
Labour	Conor Cruise O'Brien	11.6	3,588	3,600	3,601	3,642	3,693	4,205	4,239	4,519	5,366	6,629
Fianna Fáil	Michael Woods	10.0	3,093	3,401	3,404	3,433	3,456	3,494	5,450	5,909	6,029	7,352
Independent	Seán Dublin Bay Loftus	9.7	3,003	3,040	3,047	3,199	3,230	3,310	3,414	4,432	4,819	
Fine Gael	Ted Nealon	9.1	2,821	2,828	2,829	2,857	3,107	3,214	3,242	3,520		
Independent	Vincent Manning	6.7	2,076	2,100	2,109	2,228	2,269	2,355	2,431			
Fianna Fáil	Eoghan Fitzsimons	5.1	1,590	2,195	2,197	2,241	2,246	2,278				
Labour	Tom Duffy	3.0	917	924	926	958	969					
Fine Gael	Dermot Melia	1.8	549	551	552	566						
Independent	Brian Bell	1.7	527	535	543							
Independent	John Malone	0.1	40	41								
Electorate: 41,132 Valid: 30,963 Quota: 7,741 Turnout: 75.0%

== See also ==
- Dáil constituencies
- Politics of the Republic of Ireland
- Historic Dáil constituencies
- Elections in the Republic of Ireland
