= Timothy Killeen (politician) =

Irish politician (1923–1993)

Teachta Dála
- In office June 1977 – June 1981
- Constituency: Dublin Artane

Personal details
- Born: 10 May 1923 Dublin, Ireland
- Died: 2 March 1993 (aged 69) Dublin, Ireland
- Party: Fianna Fáil

Timothy Killeen (10 May 1923 – 2 March 1993) was an Irish Fianna Fáil politician. A company secretary, Killeen stood at the 1969 and 1973 general elections but was first elected to Dáil Éireann as a Teachta Dála (TD) for the Dublin Artane constituency at the 1977 general election.

Following constituency revisions, Killeen contested the 1981 general election for the Dublin North-West constituency but was defeated. He failed to be elected at the February 1982 and November 1982 general elections.

Dáil	Election	Deputy (Party)	Deputy (Party)	Deputy (Party)
21st	1977	Charles Haughey (FF)	Timothy Killeen (FF)	Noël Browne (Ind.)
22nd	1981	Constituency abolished		
