= Victor Carton =

Irish politician (1902–1970)

Senator
- In office 22 July 1954 – 5 November 1969
- Constituency: Labour Panel

Personal details
- Born: 6 January 1902 Dublin, Ireland
- Died: 11 April 1970 (aged 68)
- Party: Labour Party

Victor Patrick Carton (6 January 1902 – 11 April 1970) was an Irish Fine Gael politician. He was a member of Seanad Éireann from 1954 to 1969. He was first elected to the 8th Seanad in 1954 by the Labour Panel, and was re-elected at the 1957, 1961 and 1965 elections. He did not contest the 1969 Seanad election.

He stood for election to Dáil Éireann on four occasions but was not elected.
