= Alexis FitzGerald =

Alexis FitzGerald is the name of:

- Alexis FitzGerald Snr (1916–1985), Irish solicitor and Fine Gael senator
- His nephew Alexis FitzGerald Jnr (1945–2015), Irish Fine Gael politician, TD and senator
