= 1957 Dublin North-Central by-election =

By-election to the 16th Dáil

- 14 November 1957
- Turnout: 12,218 (45.4%)
	Sherwin	O'Byrne Gregan	Carton
Nominee	Frank Sherwin	John O'Byrne Gregan	Victor Carton
Party	Independent	Fianna Fáil	Fine Gael
First preferences	4,077	3,353	2,394
Percentage	33.4%	27.4%	19.6%
Final count	6,910	4,179	–
TD before election
Colm Gallagher
Fianna Fáil
TD after election
Frank Sherwin
Independent

A Dáil by-election was held in the constituency of Dublin North-Central in Ireland on Thursday, 14 November 1957, to fill a vacancy in the 16th Dáil. It followed the death of Fianna Fáil Teachta Dála (TD) Colm Gallagher on 26 June 1957.

The writ of election to fill the vacancy was agreed by the Dáil on 23 October 1957.

The by-election was won by the independent candidate Frank Sherwin.

== Result ==
1957 Dublin North-Central by-election
Party	Candidate	FPv%	Count			
Party	Candidate	FPv%	1	2	3	4
Independent	Frank Sherwin	33.4	4,077	4,386	5,127	6,910
Fianna Fáil	John O'Byrne Gregan	27.4	3,353	3,449	3,686	4,179
Fine Gael	Victor Carton	19.6	2,394	2,607	2,842	
Sinn Féin	Seán Garland	13.4	1,633	1,706		
Labour	Thomas Herlihy	6.2	761			
Electorate: 26,903 Valid: 12,218 Quota: 6,110 Turnout: 45.4%
