= Michael O'Halloran (Irish politician) =

Irish politician (1936–2023)

Lord Mayor of Dublin
- In office 1984–1985
- Preceded by: Michael Keating
- Succeeded by: Jim Tunney

Personal details
- Born: 7 October 1936 Dublin, Ireland
- Died: 3 May 2023 (aged 86) Dublin, Ireland
- Party: Labour Party
- Spouse: Mary O'Halloran
- Children: 4

Michael O'Halloran (7 October 1936 – 3 May 2023) was an Irish Labour Party politician and trade unionist. He was a member of Dublin City Council from 1979 to 1991. He was elected at the 1979 local elections for the Artane electoral area, and was re-elected at the 1985 local elections. He served as Lord Mayor of Dublin from 1984 to 1985. He did not contest the 1991 local elections. While Lord Mayor, he led a campaign to Save the Pint.

He stood unsuccessfully as a Labour Party candidate at the 1977 general election for Dublin Artane. He was also unsuccessful at the 1981, February 1982 and 1989 general elections for the Dublin North-Central constituency.

Civic offices
| Preceded by Michael Keating | Lord Mayor of Dublin; 1984–1985 | Succeeded by Jim Tunney |
