= Dublin North-Central =

Dáil constituency (1948–2016)

- Former Dáil constituency
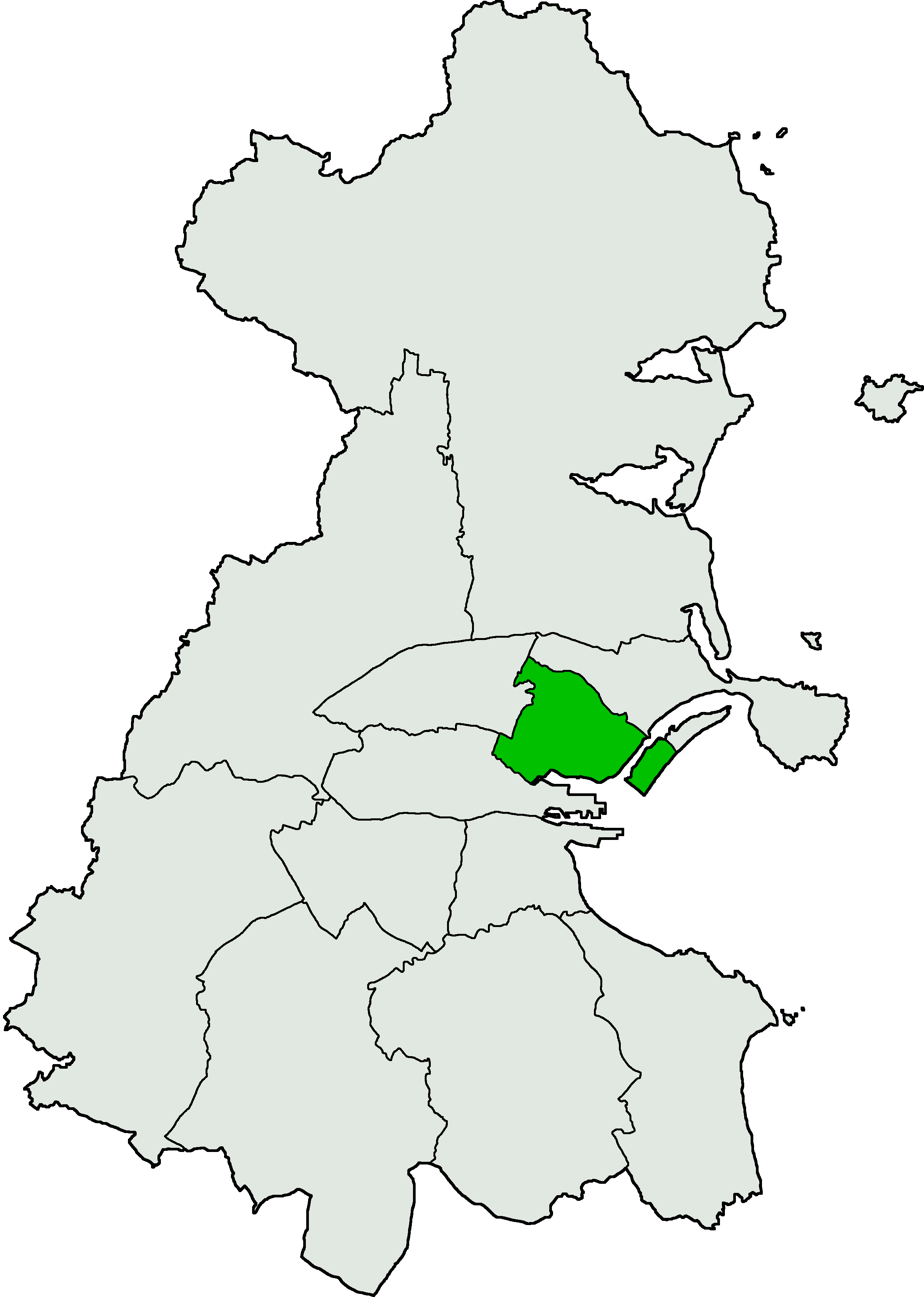
- Location of Dublin North-Central within County Dublin

Former constituency
- Created: 1948
- Abolished: 2016
- Seats: 3 (1948–1961); 4 (1961–1977); 3 (1977–1981); 4 (1981–2007); 3 (2007–2016)
- Local government area: Dublin City
- Created from: Dublin North-West
- Replaced by: Dublin Bay North

Dublin North-Central was a parliamentary constituency represented in Dáil Éireann, the lower house of the Irish parliament or Oireachtas, from 1948 to 2016. The method of election was proportional representation by means of the single transferable vote (PR-STV).

== History and boundaries ==
It varied between 3 and 4 seats from its creation in 1948. It was located on the northside of Dublin city. It was subsumed into the new Dublin Bay North constituency at the 2016 general election.

The constituency's most high-profile TD was Charles Haughey, Taoiseach from 1979 to 1981, in 1982, and from 1987 to 1992. Haughey won the first seat in the constituency at every election from 1981 until his retirement in 1992. At that election, his son Seán Haughey succeeded him in the constituency.

Changes to the Dublin North-Central constituency 1948–2016
Years	TDs	Boundaries	Notes
1948–1961	3	In the county borough of Dublin, the Glasnevin, Inn's Quay, North City and Rotunda Wards, the portion of the Mountjoy Ward not included in the Dublin North-East and the portion of the Cabragh East Ward bounded by a line drawn as follows:—Commencing at the point where the Cabra Road meets the North Circular Road thence westerly along Cabra Road to St. Peter's Road, thence northerly along and to the end of St. Peter's Road, thence in a straight line to the nearest point on the eastern side of the carriageway at Shandon Road, thence northerly along and to the end of the said side of the said carriageway, thence in a straight line to the canal, thence along the canal to the ward boundary at Liffey Junction, thence to the boundary of the Glasnevin Ward, thence southerly along the boundary of the Cabragh East Ward to the middle of the North Circular Road and thence westerly to the point first mentioned.	Formed from Dublin North-West.
1961–1969	4	In the county borough of Dublin, the Arran Quay, Inns Quay, Mountjoy, North City, North Dock and Rotunda wards.	Transfer from Dublin North-West of Arran Quay, transfer from Dublin North-East of North Dock and balance of Mountjoy
1969–1977	4	In the county borough of Dublin, Ballybough, Drumcondra South, Glasnevin, Mountjoy, North City and North Dock wards; that part of Cabragh East ward lying north of a line drawn as follows: commencing at the junction of the eastern boundary of the ward with the Royal Canal, thence in a north-westerly direction along the Royal Canal to its junction with the ward boundary; that part of Clontarf East ward which is not included in the constituency of Dublin North-East; that part of Clontarf West ward which is not included in the constituency of Dublin North-East; and that part of Finglas East ward lying south-east of a line drawn as follows: commencing at the junction of Ballygall Road East and Old Finglas Road, thence in a northerly direction along Ballygall Road East to its junction with the imaginary easterly projection of the northern boundary of Griffith Avenue Extension, thence in an easterly direction along the said imaginary projection to its intersection by the avenue of St. Clare's Home, thence in a south-easterly direction along the last-mentioned avenue to its junction with the ward boundary.	
1977–1981	3	The following wards in the county borough of Dublin Ballybough A, Ballybough B, Clontarf East D, Clontarf West C, Clontarf West D, Clontarf West E, Drumcondra South A, Drumcondra South B, Mountjoy A, Mountjoy B, North City, North Dock A, North Dock B, North Dock C, Rotunda A, Rotunda B.	
1981–1992	4	In the county borough of Dublin, the wards of Artane C, Artane D, Artane E, Artane F, Artane G, Artane H, Clontarf East A, Clontarf East B, Clontarf East C, Clontarf East D, Clontarf East E, Clontarf West A, Clontarf West B, Clontarf West C, Coolock C, Coolock D, Drumcondra North A, Drumcondra North B; and in County Dublin the part of the townland of Kilmore Big, in the district electoral division of Coolock, situated south of a line drawn along the centre of Coolock Lane and Oscar Traynor Road; the part of the townland of Santry, in the district electoral division of Drumcondra Rural Number Two, situated within a line drawn as follows: commencing at the most northerly point where the centre of Swords Road constitutes the boundary of the county borough of Dublin, thence in a northerly direction along the centre of Swords Road to its junction with the centre of Coolock Lane, thence in an easterly direction along the centre of Coolock Lane to its intersection by the eastern boundary of the townland of Santry, thence in a southerly direction along the said eastern boundary to its intersection by the boundary of the said county borough, thence commencing in a southerly direction and proceeding along the last-mentioned boundary to the said most northerly point.	Parts of Coolock and Drumcondra Rural Number Two transferred from Dublin County North.
1992–1997	4	In the county borough of Dublin, the wards of Ballybough A, Ballybough B, Beaumont A, Beaumont B, Beaumont C, Beaumont D, Beaumont E, Beaumont F, Clontarf East B, Clontarf East C, Clontarf East D, Clontarf East E, Clontarf West A, Clontarf West B, Clontarf West C, Clontarf West D, Clontarf West E, Drumcondra South A, Drumcondra South B, Grace Park, Harmonstown A, Harmonstown B, Kilmore A, Kilmore B, Kilmore D, North Dock A, Whitehall D.	Transfer of county areas to Dublin North; transfer of the Ennafort–St Annes area to Dublin North-East; transfer of Airport Road area with Dublin North-West; transfer of Marino–Fairview–North Strand area from Dublin Central.
1997–2002	4	In the county borough of Dublin, the wards of Ballybough A, Ballybough B, Beaumont A, Beaumont B, Beaumont C, Beaumont D, Beaumont E, Beaumont F, Clontarf East B, Clontarf East C, Clontarf East D, Clontarf East E, Clontarf West A, Clontarf West B, Clontarf West C, Clontarf West D, Clontarf West E, Drumcondra South A, Drumcondra South B, Grace Park, Harmonstown A, Harmonstown B, Kilmore A, Kilmore B, Kilmore D, North Dock A, North Dock B, Whitehall D.	Transfer of North Dock B from Dublin Central.
2002–2007	4	In the city of Dublin, the electoral divisions of Beaumont A, Beaumont B, Beaumont C, Beaumont D, Beaumont E, Beaumont F, Clontarf East A, Clontarf East B, Clontarf East C, Clontarf East D, Clontarf East E, Clontarf West A, Clontarf West B, Clontarf West C, Clontarf West D, Clontarf West E, Drumcondra South A, Edenmore, Grace Park, Grange E, Harmonstown A, Harmonstown B, Kilmore A, Kilmore B, Kilmore C, Kilmore D, Whitehall D.	Transfer of Ballybough A and B, Drumcondra South B, and North Dock A and B to Dublin Central; Transfer of Clontarf East A, Edenmore, Grange E and Kilmore C from Dublin North-East.
2007–2011	3	In the city of Dublin, the electoral divisions of Beaumont B, Beaumont C, Beaumont D, Beaumont E, Beaumont F, Clontarf East A, Clontarf East B, Clontarf East C, Clontarf East D, Clontarf East E, Clontarf West A, Clontarf West B, Clontarf West C, Clontarf West D, Clontarf West E, Drumcondra South A, Grace Park, Harmonstown A, Harmonstown B, Kilmore A, Kilmore B, Kilmore C, Kilmore D.	Transfer of Grange E and Edenmore to Dublin North-East; transfer of Beaumont A and Whitehall D to Dublin North-West.
2011–2016	4	In the city of Dublin, the electoral divisions of Beaumont B, Beaumont C, Beaumont D, Beaumont E, Beaumont F, Clontarf East A, Clontarf East B, Clontarf East C, Clontarf East D, Clontarf East E, Clontarf West A, Clontarf West B, Clontarf West C, Clontarf West D, Clontarf West E, Drumcondra South A, Edenmore, Grace Park, Harmonstown A, Harmonstown B, Kilmore A, Kilmore B, Kilmore C, Kilmore D.	Transfer of Edenmore from Dublin North-East.
2016	—	Constituency abolished	Merged with greater part of Dublin North-East to form Dublin Bay North.

== TDs ==
Teachtaí Dála (TDs) for Dublin North-Central 1948–2016
Key to parties: FF = Fianna Fáil; FG = Fine Gael; Ind. = Independent; Lab = Labour; SLP = Socialist Labour
Dáil	Election	Deputy (Party)	Deputy (Party)	Deputy (Party)	Deputy (Party)
13th	1948	Vivion de Valera (FF)	Martin O'Sullivan (Lab)	Patrick McGilligan (FG)	3 seats 1948–1961
14th	1951	Vivion de Valera (FF)	Colm Gallagher (FF)	Patrick McGilligan (FG)	3 seats 1948–1961
15th	1954	Vivion de Valera (FF)	Maureen O'Carroll (Lab)	Patrick McGilligan (FG)	3 seats 1948–1961
16th	1957	Vivion de Valera (FF)	Colm Gallagher (FF)	Patrick McGilligan (FG)	3 seats 1948–1961
16th	1957 by-election	Vivion de Valera (FF)	Frank Sherwin (Ind.)	Patrick McGilligan (FG)	3 seats 1948–1961
17th	1961	Vivion de Valera (FF)	Frank Sherwin (Ind.)	Patrick McGilligan (FG)	Celia Lynch (FF)
18th	1965	Vivion de Valera (FF)	Michael O'Leary (Lab)	Luke Belton (FG)	Celia Lynch (FF)
19th	1969	George Colley (FF)	Michael O'Leary (Lab)	Luke Belton (FG)	Celia Lynch (FF)
20th	1973	George Colley (FF)	Michael O'Leary (Lab)	Luke Belton (FG)	Celia Lynch (FF)
21st	1977	Vincent Brady (FF)	Michael O'Leary (Lab)	Michael Keating (FG)	3 seats 1977–1981
22nd	1981	Vincent Brady (FF)	Charles Haughey (FF)	Noël Browne (SLP)	George Birmingham (FG)
23rd	1982 (Feb)	Vincent Brady (FF)	Charles Haughey (FF)	Richard Bruton (FG)	George Birmingham (FG)
24th	1982 (Nov)	Vincent Brady (FF)	Charles Haughey (FF)	Richard Bruton (FG)	George Birmingham (FG)
25th	1987	Vincent Brady (FF)	Charles Haughey (FF)	Richard Bruton (FG)	George Birmingham (FG)
26th	1989	Vincent Brady (FF)	Charles Haughey (FF)	Richard Bruton (FG)	Ivor Callely (FF)
27th	1992	Seán Haughey (FF)	Derek McDowell (Lab)	Richard Bruton (FG)	Ivor Callely (FF)
28th	1997	Seán Haughey (FF)	Derek McDowell (Lab)	Richard Bruton (FG)	Ivor Callely (FF)
29th	2002	Seán Haughey (FF)	Finian McGrath (Ind.)	Richard Bruton (FG)	Ivor Callely (FF)
30th	2007	Seán Haughey (FF)	Finian McGrath (Ind.)	Richard Bruton (FG)	3 seats from 2007
31st	2011	Aodhán Ó Ríordáin (Lab)	Finian McGrath (Ind.)	Richard Bruton (FG)	3 seats from 2007
32nd	2016	Constituency abolished. See Dublin Bay North			

Note: The columns in this table are used only for presentational purposes, and no significance should be attached to the order of columns. For details of the order in which seats were won at each election, see the detailed results of that election.

== Elections ==
*: Outgoing TD

=== 2011 general election ===
2011 general election: Dublin North-Central
Party	Candidate	FPv%	Count						
Party	Candidate	FPv%	1	2	3	4	5	6	7
Fine Gael	Richard Bruton	25.0	9,685	9,790					
Labour	Aodhán Ó Ríordáin	22.5	8,731	8,911	9,329	10,192			
Independent	Finian McGrath	15.4	5,986	6,156	6,701	7,777	8,119	8,150	11,025
Fianna Fáil	Seán Haughey	12.9	5,017	5,077	5,128	5,295	5,338	5,348	
Fine Gael	Naoise Ó Muirí	12.8	4,959	5,033	5,098	5,240	5,353	5,403	6,399
Sinn Féin	Helen McCormack	5.6	2,165	2,187	2,602				
People Before Profit	John Lyons (Note: Lyons campaigned as a member of the United Left Alliance.)	3.6	1,399	1,587					
Green	Donna Cooney	1.3	501						
Independent	Paul Clarke	0.9	331						
Electorate: 52,992 Valid: 38,774 Spoilt: 413 (1.1%) Quota: 9,694 Turnout: 39,187 (73.9%)

=== 2007 general election ===
2007 general election: Dublin North-Central
Party	Candidate	FPv%	Count				
Party	Candidate	FPv%	1	2	3	4	5
Fine Gael	Richard Bruton	25.5	9,303				
Fianna Fáil	Seán Haughey	24.8	9,026	9,046	9,280		
Fianna Fáil	Ivor Callely	19.2	7,003	7,019	7,167	7,252	7,952
Independent	Finian McGrath	14.2	5,169	5,212	5,768	5,819	9,397
Labour	Derek McDowell	7.3	2,649	2,741	2,884	2,897	
Green	Bronwen Maher	5.2	1,891	1,913	2,160	2,186	
Sinn Féin	Peter Lawlor	3.8	1,375	1,380			
Electorate: 53,443 Valid: 36,416 Spoilt: 342 (0.9%) Quota: 9,105 Turnout: 36,758 (68.8%)

=== 2002 general election ===
2002 general election: Dublin North-Central
Party	Candidate	FPv%	Count					
Party	Candidate	FPv%	1	2	3	4	5	6
Fianna Fáil	Seán Haughey	19.0	7,614	7,655	7,718	8,028		
Fianna Fáil	Ivor Callely	17.2	6,896	6,937	7,035	7,213	7,438	7,833
Fianna Fáil	Deirdre Heney	13.8	5,533	5,564	5,627	5,802	6,101	6,527
Fine Gael	Richard Bruton	12.9	5,159	5,195	6,247	6,362	6,750	9,045
Labour	Derek McDowell	10.5	4,203	4,285	4,431	4,719	5,548	
Ind. Health Alliance	Finian McGrath	9.5	3,781	3,893	4,021	4,698	5,756	7,638
Sinn Féin	Frances McCole	5.7	2,299	2,445	2,459			
Green	Bronwen Maher	5.7	2,275	2,403	2,486	3,058		
Fine Gael	Gerry Breen	4.1	1,650	1,661				
Socialist Workers	Ritchie Brown	1.6	638					
Electorate: 65,583 Valid: 40,048 Spoilt: 427 (1.1%) Quota: 8,010 Turnout: 40,475 (61.7%)

=== 1997 general election ===
1997 general election: Dublin North-Central
Party	Candidate	FPv%	Count										
Party	Candidate	FPv%	1	2	3	4	5	6	7	8	9	10	11
Fianna Fáil	Ivor Callely	25.9	11,190										
Fine Gael	Richard Bruton	19.0	8,196	8,364	8,376	8,447	8,639						
Fianna Fáil	Seán Haughey	17.8	7,670	8,901									
Labour	Derek McDowell	6.6	2,848	2,891	2,896	2,972	3,489	3,633	3,718	4,025	4,669	6,490	6,992
Independent	Seán Dublin Bay Rockall Loftus	5.8	2,485	2,578	2,595	2,689	2,772	2,857	3,115	3,504	4,428	5,176	6,616
Fine Gael	Niamh Cosgrave	3.9	1,713	1,743	1,746	1,771	1,849	2,858	3,001	3,193	3,475		
Green	Stephen Rawson	3.8	1,650	1,692	1,697	1,834	1,989	2,019	2,213	2,747			
Independent	Finian McGrath	3.6	1,551	1,595	1,600	1,709	1,797	1,823	1,930				
Progressive Democrats	Ronan Garvey	3.3	1,424	1,568	1,584	1,602	1,642	1,665					
Fine Gael	Cathy Fay	3.1	1,326	1,352	1,354	1,372	1,435						
Democratic Left	Helen Lahert	2.8	1,194	1,226	1,229	1,338							
Fianna Fáil	Ita Green	2.7	1,184	1,867	2,065	2,114	2,163	2,217	2,913	3,155	3,489	3,784	
Socialist Workers	Richard Browne	1.6	698	717	718								
Independent	Norman Hunt Jnr.	0.1	36	37	37								
Electorate: 66,559 Valid: 43,165 Spoilt: 456 (1.1%) Quota: 8,634 Turnout: 43,621 (65.5%)

=== 1992 general election ===
1992 general election: Dublin North-Central
Party	Candidate	FPv%	Count												
Party	Candidate	FPv%	1	2	3	4	5	6	7	8	9	10	11	12	13
Labour	Derek McDowell	23.1	10,609												
Fianna Fáil	Seán Haughey	17.9	8,202	8,276	8,289	8,300	8,309	8,340	8,418	8,495	8,631	8,837	8,945	10,912	
Fine Gael	Richard Bruton	16.7	7,657	8,001	8,012	8,020	8,031	8,073	8,101	8,251	8,651	10,505			
Fianna Fáil	Ivor Callely	12.9	5,917	5,991	5,996	6,007	6,015	6,038	6,083	6,138	6,229	6,365	6,511	8,145	9,632
Fianna Fáil	John Stafford	8.2	3,759	3,808	3,814	3,823	3,830	3,876	3,922	4,012	4,086	4,351	4,513		
Independent	Seán Dublin Bay Rockall Loftus	7.7	3,551	3,733	3,755	3,806	3,851	3,956	4,094	4,391	5,082	5,376	6,237	6,639	6,789
Fine Gael	Pat Lee	5.7	2,620	2,739	2,746	2,754	2,765	2,797	2,817	2,873	3,019				
Democratic Left	Helen Lahert	3.0	1,376	1,765	1,781	1,806	1,823	1,859	1,934	2,136					
Independent	Finian McGrath	1.7	764	846	856	866	901	970	1,133						
Sinn Féin	Nick McBennett	1.4	644	671	673	675	684	696							
Independent	Noel O'Hanrahan	0.8	363	401	406	408	443								
Independent	Tony O'Byrne	0.3	156	185	192	219									
Independent	Mary Margaret Doyle Dunne	0.3	143	155	178										
Independent	Rosemary Burns	0.3	122	135											
Electorate: 64,859 Valid: 45,883 Spoilt: 634 (1.4%) Quota: 9,177 Turnout: 46,517 (71.7%)

=== 1989 general election ===
1989 general election: Dublin North-Central
Party	Candidate	FPv%	Count								
Party	Candidate	FPv%	1	2	3	4	5	6	7	8	9
Fianna Fáil	Charles Haughey	23.8	9,105								
Fianna Fáil	Ivor Callely	13.9	5,340	5,836	5,841	5,846	5,873	5,909	6,126	6,350	6,897
Fine Gael	Richard Bruton	13.9	5,323	5,374	5,385	5,394	5,614	5,683	5,976	6,281	7,704
Fianna Fáil	Vincent Brady	13.9	5,320	6,116	6,119	6,130	6,156	6,181	6,418	6,616	6,958
Fine Gael	George Birmingham	12.1	4,631	4,659	4,674	4,677	4,888	4,940	5,225	5,356	6,140
Workers' Party	Triona Dooney	6.8	2,595	2,614	2,635	2,671	2,717	2,899	3,168		
Labour	Michael O'Halloran	5.0	1,928	1,948	1,952	1,962	2,001	3,028	3,335	5,136	
Independent	Seán Dublin Bay Rockall Loftus	4.2	1,612	1,633	1,652	1,752	1,827	1,878			
Labour	Derek McDowell	3.7	1,398	1,410	1,431	1,448	1,474				
Progressive Democrats	Una O'Mahony	1.8	690	694	698	702					
Independent	Tom Denning	0.5	191	193	225						
Independent	Don Donnelly	0.4	141	142							
Electorate: 55,827 Valid: 38,274 Quota: 7,655 Turnout: 68.5%

=== 1987 general election ===
1987 general election: Dublin North-Central
Party	Candidate	FPv%	Count									
Party	Candidate	FPv%	1	2	3	4	5	6	7	8	9	10
Fianna Fáil	Charles Haughey	30.3	12,986									
Fine Gael	George Birmingham	12.1	5,201	5,252	5,253	5,264	5,325	5,332	5,505	5,594	6,852	7,854
Fine Gael	Richard Bruton	12.1	5,196	5,273	5,276	5,283	5,359	5,373	5,553	5,688	6,960	8,325
Fianna Fáil	Vincent Brady	10.4	4,454	7,012	7,019	7,049	7,071	7,200	7,465	7,679	7,995	8,654
Fianna Fáil	Ivor Callely	9.1	3,904	5,266	5,274	5,282	5,331	5,478	5,646	5,882	6,160	6,896
Progressive Democrats	James O'Hanrahan	8.3	3,582	3,623	3,629	3,637	3,724	3,745	4,032	4,229	5,258	
Labour	Flor O'Mahony	6.9	2,973	3,083	3,090	3,104	3,260	3,363	3,557	4,529		
Workers' Party	Triona Dooney	3.8	1,643	1,694	1,701	1,706	1,885	2,096	2,287			
Independent	Seán Dublin Bay Rockall Loftus	3.1	1,341	1,392	1,419	1,440	1,482	1,581				
Sinn Féin	Ciaran MacCormaic	1.8	779	815	820	822	870					
Democratic Socialist	Philip O'Connor	1.6	681	733	734	745						
Independent	Austin McCoy	0.3	111	117	122							
Independent	Barbara Hyland	0.2	73	79								
Electorate: 57,167 Valid: 42,924 Quota: 8,585 Turnout: 75.1%

=== November 1982 general election ===
November 1982 general election: Dublin North-Central
Party	Candidate	FPv%	Count							
Party	Candidate	FPv%	1	2	3	4	5	6	7	8
Fianna Fáil	Charles Haughey	35.9	14,516							
Fine Gael	George Birmingham	21.9	8,876							
Fine Gael	Richard Bruton	14.7	5,948	6,094	6,826	6,887	6,977	7,179	7,292	7,858
Fianna Fáil	Vincent Brady	8.6	3,465	7,569	7,587	7,613	7,782	7,983	11,654	
Labour	Flor O'Mahony	7.6	3,082	3,188	3,206	3,315	3,549	4,682	4,783	5,778
Fianna Fáil	Ita Greene	4.3	1,746	3,641	3,646	3,666	3,837	4,020		
Workers' Party	Pádraig Yeates	3.7	1,476	1,534	1,537	1,633	2,013			
Independent	Bernadette McAliskey	2.5	1,023	1,117	1,120	1,148				
Democratic Socialist	Philip O'Connor	0.6	224	238	239					
Independent	Andrew Dillon	0.3	114	118	119					
Electorate: 55,735 Valid: 40,470 Quota: 8,095 Turnout: 72.6%

=== February 1982 general election ===
February 1982 general election: Dublin North-Central
Party	Candidate	FPv%	Count										
Party	Candidate	FPv%	1	2	3	4	5	6	7	8	9	10	11
Fianna Fáil	Charles Haughey	39.6	16,143										
Fine Gael	George Birmingham	18.9	7,727	7,829	7,836	7,858	7,864	8,274					
Fine Gael	Richard Bruton	11.3	4,591	4,676	4,679	4,696	4,705	5,184	5,281	5,941	6,010	6,352	8,488
Fianna Fáil	Vincent Brady	7.9	3,212	7,955	7,972	8,004	8,017	8,067	8,069	8,599			
Labour	Michael O'Halloran	5.3	2,172	2,304	2,316	2,345	2,430	2,470	2,477	2,734	2,753	3,508	
Independent	Bernadette McAliskey	5.1	2,085	2,317	2,325	2,340	2,438	2,459	2,460	2,715	2,740		
Independent	Seán Dublin Bay Rockall Loftus	4.4	1,801	1,966	1,975	2,040	2,067	2,100	2,105				
Fianna Fáil	Ita Greene	3.7	1,517	3,950	3,966	3,998	4,006	4,040	4,042	4,278	4,604	5,479	5,988
Fine Gael	Mary Byrne	2.5	1,004	1,051	1,054	1,072	1,077						
Communist	John Curley	0.6	240	252	254	266							
Independent	T.C.G. O'Mahony	0.5	214	232	252								
Independent	Anthony O'Hara	0.2	89	103									
Electorate: 54,726 Valid: 40,795 Quota: 8,160 Turnout: 74.5%

=== 1981 general election ===
1981 general election: Dublin North-Central
Party	Candidate	FPv%	Count										
Party	Candidate	FPv%	1	2	3	4	5	6	7	8	9	10	11
Fianna Fáil	Charles Haughey	43.5	17,637										
Fine Gael	George Birmingham	15.5	6,304	6,478	6,482	6,485	6,532	7,286	7,551	7,617	8,164		
Socialist Labour	Noël Browne	12.4	5,031	5,633	5,645	5,728	5,806	5,897	6,184	6,949	7,776	9,414	
Fine Gael	Paddy Belton	7.1	2,899	3,006	3,010	3,014	3,033	3,232	3,397	3,451	3,645		
Fianna Fáil	Vincent Brady	4.5	1,818	5,678	5,684	5,686	5,720	5,756	5,957	6,214	6,304	6,667	6,961
Independent	Vincent Doherty	3.7	1,481	1,628	1,631	1,663	1,681	1,683	1,733				
Fianna Fáil	Eugene Timmons	3.0	1,209	5,433	5,438	5,441	5,488	5,513	5,678	5,970	6,109	6,453	6,778
Fine Gael	Mary Byrne	2.8	1,138	1,197	1,201	1,202	1,223						
Labour	Michael O'Halloran	2.7	1,093	1,199	1,202	1,213	1,747	1,788	1,861	1,990			
Independent	Hannah Barlow	2.6	1,039	1,195	1,202	1,215	1,226	1,288					
Labour	Michael Martin	1.8	730	804	804	814							
Communist	John Curley	0.4	156	161	164								
Independent	Andrew Dillon	0.1	46	52									
Electorate: 54,726 Valid: 40,581 Quota: 8,117 Turnout: 74.2%

=== 1977 general election ===
1977 general election: Dublin North-Central
Party	Candidate	FPv%	Count					
Party	Candidate	FPv%	1	2	3	4	5	6
Labour	Michael O'Leary	20.2	4,729	5,319	5,641	5,754	6,014	
Fianna Fáil	Vincent Brady	19.9	4,678	4,700	4,814	5,861		
Fianna Fáil	Noel Mulcahy	13.6	3,198	3,216	3,318	3,840	3,894	4,612
Fine Gael	Michael Keating	12.4	2,912	3,003	3,058	3,093	4,933	5,826
Fine Gael	Ray Fay	9.2	2,166	2,258	2,285	2,328		
Independent	Kevin Byrne	8.1	1,903	1,942	2,287	2,376	2,466	
Fianna Fáil	William Doran	7.6	1,775	1,808	1,878			
Sinn Féin The Workers' Party	Raymond McGran	4.9	1,138	1,179				
Labour	William Cumiskey	4.0	953					
Electorate: 37,934 Valid: 25,528 Spoilt: 245 (0.9%) Quota: 5,883 Turnout: 25,773 (67.9%)

=== 1973 general election ===
1973 general election: Dublin North-Central
Party	Candidate	FPv%	Count								
Party	Candidate	FPv%	1	2	3	4	5	6	7	8	9
Fianna Fáil	George Colley	29.8	10,263								
Labour	Michael O'Leary	16.8	5,795	5,878	6,009	6,062	6,178	7,089			
Fine Gael	Luke Belton	16.3	5,624	5,678	5,708	5,745	5,863	5,949	6,557	7,058	
Fine Gael	Patrick Lindsay	8.9	3,078	3,110	3,124	3,152	3,241	3,300	3,910	4,290	4,398
Fianna Fáil	Celia Lynch	8.8	3,025	4,158	4,168	4,206	4,283	4,307	4,362	4,517	7,659
Sinn Féin	Máirín de Burca	4.8	1,667	1,694	1,710	1,901	1,975	2,056	2,088		
Fianna Fáil	John Kenny	3.7	1,274	3,243	3,247	3,276	3,321	3,342	3,371	3,481	
Fine Gael	Alice Glenn	3.6	1,240	1,260	1,279	1,295	1,343	1,413			
Labour	William Cumiskey	3.2	1,106	1,130	1,241	1,259	1,291				
Independent	Seán Dublin Bay Rockall Loftus (Note: Appeared on the ballot as Seán D. Christian Democrat Dublin Bay Loftus)	1.7	578	591	591	635					
Aontacht Éireann	Nóirín Butler	1.4	489	494	497						
Labour	Seoirse Dearle	1.0	345	356							
Electorate: 49,073 Valid: 34,484 Quota: 6,897 Turnout: 70.3%

=== 1969 general election ===
1969 general election: Dublin North-Central
Party	Candidate	FPv%	Count								
Party	Candidate	FPv%	1	2	3	4	5	6	7	8	9
Fianna Fáil	George Colley	29.0	10,519								
Labour	Michael O'Leary	20.4	7,423								
Fine Gael	Luke Belton	12.8	4,655	4,703	4,724	4,729	5,174	5,202	5,659	5,841	6,039
Fine Gael	Patrick Lindsay	12.5	4,552	4,616	4,629	4,637	5,173	5,200	5,555	5,676	5,798
Fianna Fáil	Celia Lynch	7.2	2,607	4,350	4,374	4,378	4,411	4,977	5,171	7,585	
Labour	William Cumiskey	5.8	2,089	2,131	2,897	3,029	3,055	3,082			
Fianna Fáil	Thomas Stafford	5.3	1,919	2,595	2,620	2,624	2,640	3,193	3,357		
Fine Gael	Michael Kelly	2.9	1,055	1,083	1,098	1,100					
Labour	James Quinn	2.4	891	914							
Fianna Fáil	Dermot Ryan	1.7	610	1,240	1,256	1,259	1,269				
Electorate: 50,868 Valid: 36,320 Quota: 7,265 Turnout: 71.4%

=== 1965 general election ===
1965 general election: Dublin North-Central
Party	Candidate	FPv%	Count										
Party	Candidate	FPv%	1	2	3	4	5	6	7	8	9	10	11
Fianna Fáil	Vivion de Valera	31.1	8,376										
Fine Gael	Luke Belton	11.1	2,999	3,033	3,057	3,185	3,660	3,681	3,729	3,825	4,089	6,650	
Labour	Susan Geraghty Bowler	9.0	2,418	2,462	2,476	2,612	2,682	2,707	2,745	3,317	3,782	3,934	4,516
Fine Gael	Patrick McGilligan	8.4	2,276	2,301	2,313	2,410	2,974	2,991	3,011	3,098	3,268		
Fianna Fáil	Celia Lynch	8.1	2,192	4,198	4,212	4,360	4,394	5,826					
Labour	Michael O'Leary	7.9	2,122	2,157	2,185	2,344	2,406	2,468	2,531	3,359	3,787	3,986	4,659
Independent	Frank Sherwin	6.0	1,615	1,645	1,663	1,826	1,882	1,940	2,162	2,237			
Labour	Thomas Herlihy	5.6	1,517	1,580	1,592	1,694	1,735	1,768	1,808				
Fine Gael	James Maher	4.6	1,251	1,279	1,294	1,389							
Clann na Poblachta	Leo Nealon	4.0	1,080	1,131	1,157								
Fianna Fáil	Pádraic Ó Cléirigh	3.5	953	1,609	1,619	1,684	1,703						
Independent	George Murphy	0.6	172	181									
Electorate: 41,997 Valid: 26,971 Quota: 5,395 Turnout: 64.2%

=== 1961 general election ===
1961 general election: Dublin North-Central
Party	Candidate	FPv%	Count							
Party	Candidate	FPv%	1	2	3	4	5	6	7	8
Fianna Fáil	Vivion de Valera	29.5	7,282							
Independent	Frank Sherwin	21.7	5,356							
Fine Gael	Patrick McGilligan	10.4	2,572	2,640	2,681	2,702	2,727	3,275	4,366	4,776
Independent	Thomas Stafford	9.3	2,284	2,433	2,600	2,663	2,770	2,962	3,214	3,806
Fianna Fáil	Celia Lynch	8.3	2,043	3,352	3,428	3,480	4,494	4,578	4,703	5,042
Fine Gael	Luke Belton	5.5	1,365	1,413	1,445	1,483	1,508	1,826		
Fine Gael	James Maher	4.9	1,214	1,266	1,298	1,320	1,341			
Labour	Thomas Herlihy	4.0	987	1,093	1,125	1,795	1,839	1,913	2,068	
Labour	Diarmuid Collins	3.4	843	894	919					
Fianna Fáil	Pádraic Ó Cléirigh	2.9	723	1,288	1,305	1,319				
Electorate: 43,742 Valid: 24,669 Quota: 4,934 Turnout: 56.4%

=== 1957 by-election ===
Following the death of Fianna Fáil TD Colm Gallagher, a by-election was held on 14 November 1957. The seat was won by Independent candidate Frank Sherwin.

1957 by-election: Dublin North-Central
Party	Candidate	FPv%	Count			
Party	Candidate	FPv%	1	2	3	4
Independent	Frank Sherwin	33.4	4,077	4,386	5,127	6,910
Fianna Fáil	John O'Byrne Gregan	27.4	3,353	3,449	3,686	4,179
Fine Gael	Victor Carton	19.6	2,394	2,607	2,842	
Sinn Féin	Seán Garland	13.4	1,633	1,706		
Labour	Thomas Herlihy	6.2	761			
Electorate: 26,903 Valid: 12,218 Quota: 6,110 Turnout: 45.4%

=== 1957 general election ===
1957 general election: Dublin North-Central
Party	Candidate	FPv%	Count					
Party	Candidate	FPv%	1	2	3	4	5	6
Fianna Fáil	Vivion de Valera	33.7	5,421					
Fine Gael	Patrick McGilligan	18.6	2,985	3,016	3,431	3,546	3,709	4,135
Independent	Frank Sherwin	15.1	2,425	2,498	2,553	2,721	2,859	3,505
Fianna Fáil	Colm Gallagher	14.5	2,330	3,492	3,523	3,626	3,764	4,009
Labour	Maureen O'Carroll	6.8	1,088	1,129	1,186	1,320	1,591	
Independent	Kathleen Swanton	4.2	669	685	716	787		
Fine Gael	Frederick Mullen	3.7	594	609				
Clann na Poblachta	Tomás Doherty	3.5	569	631	642			
Electorate: 28,009 Valid: 16,081 Quota: 4,021 Turnout: 57.4%

=== 1954 general election ===
1954 general election: Dublin North-Central
Party	Candidate	FPv%	Count					
Party	Candidate	FPv%	1	2	3	4	5	6
Fianna Fáil	Vivion de Valera	29.2	5,945					
Fine Gael	Patrick McGilligan	25.4	5,168					
Clann na Poblachta	Fionán Breathnach	11.9	2,420	2,466	2,470	2,591	3,190	
Fianna Fáil	Colm Gallagher	11.2	2,278	3,037	3,038	3,101	3,269	4,009
Fine Gael	John Hedigan	9.4	1,915	1,929	1,981	2,105		
Labour	Maureen O'Carroll	7.1	1,443	1,460	1,465	2,348	3,216	4,969
Labour	Thomas Herlihy	6.0	1,215	1,227	1,236			
Electorate: 30,570 Valid: 20,384 Quota: 5,097 Turnout: 66.7%

=== 1951 general election ===
1951 general election: Dublin North-Central
Party	Candidate	FPv%	Count				
Party	Candidate	FPv%	1	2	3	4	5
Fianna Fáil	Vivion de Valera	41.0	9,307				
Fine Gael	Patrick McGilligan	21.8	4,956	5,069	5,366	5,388	5,769
Labour	Martin O'Sullivan	15.5	3,526	3,701	4,147	4,154	5,191
Fianna Fáil	Colm Gallagher	10.6	2,397	5,462	5,712		
Independent	Michael Mullen	6.3	1,434	1,571	1,726	1,734	
Clann na Poblachta	Fionán Breathnach	4.7	1,076	1,218			
Electorate: 34,456 Valid: 22,696 Quota: 5,675 Turnout: 65.9%

=== 1948 general election ===
1948 general election: Dublin North-Central
Party	Candidate	FPv%	Count							
Party	Candidate	FPv%	1	2	3	4	5	6	7	8
Fianna Fáil	Vivion de Valera	40.8	9,682							
Fine Gael	Patrick McGilligan	16.3	3,878	3,966	3,995	4,381	4,420	4,578	5,307	6,094
Labour	Martin O'Sullivan	16.3	3,873	4,149	4,309	4,349	4,473	4,713	7,055	
Clann na Poblachta	Fionán Breathnach	11.4	2,708	2,863	2,884	2,888	2,922	4,169		
Clann na Poblachta	Christopher A. Macken	6.7	1,596	1,671	1,697	1,741	1,767			
Fianna Fáil	Colm Gallagher	3.3	780	2,970	3,001	3,020	4,169	4,215	4,666	4,993
Fianna Fáil	John S. O'Connor	2.1	505	1,394	1,411	1,427				
Fine Gael	Michael Hughes	2.0	468	513	517					
National Labour Party	George Walker	1.1	271	294						
Electorate: 35,989 Valid: 23,761 Quota: 5,941 Turnout: 66.0%

== See also ==
- Dáil constituencies
- Politics of the Republic of Ireland
- Historic Dáil constituencies
- Elections in the Republic of Ireland
