= 1985 Westmeath County Council election =

Part of the 1985 Irish local elections

← 1979	20 June 1985	1991 →

All 23 seats on Westmeath County Council
	First party	Second party	Third party
Party	Fianna Fáil	Fine Gael	Labour
Seats won	13	5	3
Seat change	+3	-4	-
	Fourth party
Party	Independent
Seats won	2
Seat change	+1
- Map showing the area of Westmeath County Council
Council control before election
Fianna Fáil
Council control after election
Fianna Fáil

An election to Westmeath County Council took place on 20 June 1985 as part of the Irish local elections. 23 councillors were elected from five local electoral areas (LEAs) for a five-year term of office on the electoral system of proportional representation by means of the single transferable vote (PR-STV). This term was extended for a further year, to 1991.

== Results by party ==
Party	Seats	±	First Pref. votes	FPv%	±%
Fianna Fáil	13	+3	13,398	48.14	
Fine Gael	5	-4	7,753	27.86	
Labour	3	-	3,557	12.78	
Independent	2	+1	2,703	9.71	
Totals	23	-	27,831	100.00	—

== Results by local electoral area ==
=== Athlone ===
Athlone: 7 seats
Party	Candidate	FPv%	Count																
Party	Candidate	FPv%	1	2	3	4	5	6	7	8	9	10	11	12	13	14	15	16	17
Fianna Fáil	Mary O'Rourke TD*		1,876																
Fianna Fáil	Sen. Seán Fallon*		1,001	1,288															
Fianna Fáil	P.J. Coghill*		737	923	945	947	954	956	969	997	1,016	1,033	1,048	1,080	1,096	1,207			
Independent	Stephen Price		773	800	804	810	838	843	850	876	888	938	954	996	1,083	1,355			
Fine Gael	Vincent Dooley		598	605	606	606	612	621	637	644	658	667	705	734	747	772	777	795	799
Fine Gael	George Allen*		592	605	606	606	611	625	668	675	691	717	811	847	867	903	913	962	966
Fine Gael	Brendan McFadden*		591	620	626	626	629	665	754	764	822	880	1,035	1,103	1,184				
Fianna Fáil	John Dillon*		494	515	529	534	546	548	551	560	562	566	572	586	603				
Independent	Oliver Gavin		319	357	361	367	367	372	376	408	432	502	509	555					
Fianna Fáil	Padraic Dunne		318	404	450	451	455	464	476	494	509	532	559	615	681	755	760	807	842
Fine Gael	Des Lynch		293	309	311	311	311	335	388	390	409	430							
Fine Gael	Kevin O'Brien		266	276	277	277	277	283											
Labour	John Henson		256	278	281	284	295	321	328	371	432	457	483						
Labour	John Keenehan		248	273	280	282	286	319	324	340									
Independent	Frank Waters		241	280	288	290	292	300	315	344	384								
Sinn Féin	Tony Hogan		230	242	243	292	302	304	307										
Labour	Neil O'Shea		161	178	181	181	192												
Labour	Michael McCallon		97	101	101	105													
Sinn Féin	Gerald Farrell		85	88	89														
Electorate: 15,067 Valid: 9,306 (62.88%) Spoilt: 168 Quota: 1,164 Turnout: 9,474

=== Coole ===
Coole: 4 seats
Party	Candidate	FPv%	Count							
Party	Candidate	FPv%	1	2	3	4	5	6	7	8
Fianna Fáil	Sen. Donie Cassidy		1,284							
Fianna Fáil	P.J. O'Shaughnessy*		899	959	996	1,006				
Fianna Fáil	Thomas Bourke		683	750	753	813	868	868	900	943
Fine Gael	Frank McDermott*		575	601	684	705	935	936	1,351	
Fianna Fáil	Molly Cahill		401	510	518	535	538	540	570	625
Fine Gael	Colm Smyth		390	406	429	445	538	540		
Fine Gael	Michael Leslie*		327	330	368	419				
Labour	Paddy Jordan		217	220	234					
Fine Gael	Betty Leonard		211	213						
Electorate: 7,124 Valid: 4,987 (71%) Spoilt: 71 Quota: 998 Turnout: 5,058

=== Kilbeggan ===
Kilbeggan: 4 seats
Party	Candidate	FPv%	Count					
Party	Candidate	FPv%	1	2	3	4	5	6
Fianna Fáil	Seán Keegan*		1,013					
Fine Gael	Joe Flanagan*		868	891	897	899	1,325	
Fianna Fáil	Michael Ryan		661	686	1,055			
Fine Gael	Edward Farrell*		582	590	599	605		
Fine Gael	Eamon Duigenan		580	611	700	732	778	1,060
Independent	Gerald Cooney		551	612	630	652	676	694
Fianna Fáil	Patrick Whelehan		515	539				
Independent	Frank Abbott		160					
Independent	Rene Ennis-Lennon		30					
Electorate: 7,410 Valid: 4,960 (69.62%) Spoilt: 199 Quota: 993 Turnout: 5,159

=== Mullingar Lough Owel ===
Mullingar Lough Owel: 4 seats
Party	Candidate	FPv%	Count						
Party	Candidate	FPv%	1	2	3	4	5	6	7
Fianna Fáil	Henry Abbott*		843	844	862	982			
Labour	Willie Penrose*		671	682	721	755	757	796	901
Labour	Sen. Helena McAuliffe-Ennis		652	679	689	719	719	861	915
Fianna Fáil	Shay Callaghan*		512	517	521	529	600	884	902
Fianna Fáil	Tommy Wright		408	413	421	511	530		
Fine Gael	John Keegan*		387	455	560	569	570	580	895
Fine Gael	Shay Boyhan		380	418	534	545	547	554	
Fianna Fáil	Patrick Nolan		356	359	365				
Fine Gael	Declan Fagan		277	312					
Fine Gael	John Delemara		195						
Electorate: 7,356 Valid: 4,681 (64.49%) Spoilt: 63 Quota: 937 Turnout: 4,744

=== Mullingar Urban ===
Mullingar Urban: 4 seats
Party	Candidate	FPv%	Count								
Party	Candidate	FPv%	1	2	3	4	5	6	7	8	9
Labour	Mick Dollard		907								
Fianna Fáil	Camillus Glynn*		773	793							
Independent	Frank McIntyre		357	384	388	406	456	563	601	829	
Fianna Fáil	Martin Hynes		353	361	364	366	453	518	536	622	643
Labour	Jack Coleman*		348	392	293	403	435	476	523		
Independent	Eddie Byrne		272	282	284	288	304				
Fine Gael	Frank Wallace		271	273	274	315	322	350	544	612	640
Fine Gael	Denis Burke		269	273	274	296	305	328			
Fianna Fáil	Kathleen Campbell		141	146	147	149					
Sinn Féin	Billy Cleary		105	108	108	108					
Fine Gael	Mary Mahon		101	105	105						
Electorate: 6,654 Valid: 3,897 (59.15%) Spoilt: 39 Quota: 780 Turnout: 3,936
