= Frank Sherwin (politician) =

Irish politician (1905–1981)

Teachta Dála
- In office November 1957 – April 1965
- Constituency: Dublin North-Central

Personal details
- Born: 6 October 1905 Dublin, Ireland
- Died: 7 November 1981 (aged 76) Dublin, Ireland
- Party: Independent
- Spouse: Rosanna Kinsella (m. 1935)
- Children: 9

Frank Sherwin (6 October 1905 – 7 November 1981) was an Irish independent politician who sat for eight years as Teachta Dála (TD) for Dublin North-Central, from 1957 to 1965.

== Early life ==
Sherwin was born in Upper Dorset Street in inner-city Dublin in 1905, son of Christopher Sherwin, a labourer from Dublin, and his wife Mary Jane (née Ford). At the age of ten he witnessed intense fighting on North King Street near his home during the Easter Rising of 1916. He left school at 13, and became an apprentice harness-maker.

As a teenager, Sherwin joined the Fianna Éireann (youth wing of the Irish Republican Army) and participated in the Irish War of Independence.

He took part in the Irish Civil War on the anti-treaty side. He was captured after an attack on Wellington Barracks in November 1922, and badly beaten in custody. As a result, he eventually suffered a stroke and lost the use of his right arm. He was held for twenty months at several detention centres, including Mountjoy Prison, Dublin, and Tintown camp, Curragh, County Kildare. He was transferred to the criminal area of Mountjoy Prison, he was sentenced to twelve months’ imprisonment for allegedly stealing two typewriters. After a personal appeal to the minister for justice, Kevin O'Higgins, the sentence was quashed, and Sherwin was released in July 1924.

He afterwards ran a dance hall, and at one point he operated 27 halls in Dublin city and county.

== Politician ==
Sherwin joined Fianna Fáil in 1926, and in 1939 was elected to the party's Ard Comhairle (National Executive). During World War II he joined the Irish Army as a reserve with other Fianna veterans. He fell out with Fianna Fáil in 1943 after the party refused to nominate him as a candidate for a general election. After a brief flirtation with Clann na Poblachta, he first ran as an independent in 1945.

He stood for Dáil Éireann as an independent candidate in the three-seat Dublin North–Central constituency at the 1957 general election, failing to be elected with just over 15% of the first-preference vote. One of the successful candidates, Fianna Fáil TD Colm Gallagher, died in June 1957, just three months after the election. This triggered a by-election on 14 November, which Sherwin won.

The constituency was expanded to a four-seater for the 1961 general election, and Sherwin retained his Dáil seat comfortably, winning over 21% of the first-preference vote. However, his vote fell at the 1965 election to less than 6%, and he lost his seat to the Labour Party's Michael O'Leary.

He was a member of Dublin City Council as an independent, from 1955 to 1967 and from 1974 to 1981.

== Political views ==
Sherwin has been described as "colourful". In 1958, when the Dáil was debating allowing women to join the Garda Síochána, he suggested that "while recruits should not be actually horse faced, they should not be too good looking. They should be just plain women and not targets for marriage".

He remained a republican sympathiser throughout his life and wrote in his memoirs in the 1970s that "The Provisional IRA can not be expected to disappear as if they had never fought and suffered". On the Northern Ireland question he wrote, "the solution to the northern problem is for the British Army to get out... The Orangemen would not last a week against the northern nationalists supported by southern government. If the Orangemen did fight it would be a good thing in the long run as it would clear the northern area of foreign bigots".

Dublin's Frank Sherwin Bridge, opened in 1982, is named in his honour.

He married Rosanna Kinsella, of Gardiner St., Dublin in 1937; and they had six sons and three daughters.

Dáil	Election	Deputy (Party)	Deputy (Party)	Deputy (Party)	Deputy (Party)
13th	1948	Vivion de Valera (FF)	Martin O'Sullivan (Lab)	Patrick McGilligan (FG)	3 seats 1948–1961
14th	1951	Vivion de Valera (FF)	Colm Gallagher (FF)	Patrick McGilligan (FG)	3 seats 1948–1961
15th	1954	Vivion de Valera (FF)	Maureen O'Carroll (Lab)	Patrick McGilligan (FG)	3 seats 1948–1961
16th	1957	Vivion de Valera (FF)	Colm Gallagher (FF)	Patrick McGilligan (FG)	3 seats 1948–1961
16th	1957 by-election	Vivion de Valera (FF)	Frank Sherwin (Ind.)	Patrick McGilligan (FG)	3 seats 1948–1961
17th	1961	Vivion de Valera (FF)	Frank Sherwin (Ind.)	Patrick McGilligan (FG)	Celia Lynch (FF)
18th	1965	Vivion de Valera (FF)	Michael O'Leary (Lab)	Luke Belton (FG)	Celia Lynch (FF)
19th	1969	George Colley (FF)	Michael O'Leary (Lab)	Luke Belton (FG)	Celia Lynch (FF)
20th	1973	George Colley (FF)	Michael O'Leary (Lab)	Luke Belton (FG)	Celia Lynch (FF)
21st	1977	Vincent Brady (FF)	Michael O'Leary (Lab)	Michael Keating (FG)	3 seats 1977–1981
22nd	1981	Vincent Brady (FF)	Charles Haughey (FF)	Noël Browne (SLP)	George Birmingham (FG)
23rd	1982 (Feb)	Vincent Brady (FF)	Charles Haughey (FF)	Richard Bruton (FG)	George Birmingham (FG)
24th	1982 (Nov)	Vincent Brady (FF)	Charles Haughey (FF)	Richard Bruton (FG)	George Birmingham (FG)
25th	1987	Vincent Brady (FF)	Charles Haughey (FF)	Richard Bruton (FG)	George Birmingham (FG)
26th	1989	Vincent Brady (FF)	Charles Haughey (FF)	Richard Bruton (FG)	Ivor Callely (FF)
27th	1992	Seán Haughey (FF)	Derek McDowell (Lab)	Richard Bruton (FG)	Ivor Callely (FF)
28th	1997	Seán Haughey (FF)	Derek McDowell (Lab)	Richard Bruton (FG)	Ivor Callely (FF)
29th	2002	Seán Haughey (FF)	Finian McGrath (Ind.)	Richard Bruton (FG)	Ivor Callely (FF)
30th	2007	Seán Haughey (FF)	Finian McGrath (Ind.)	Richard Bruton (FG)	3 seats from 2007
31st	2011	Aodhán Ó Ríordáin (Lab)	Finian McGrath (Ind.)	Richard Bruton (FG)	3 seats from 2007
32nd	2016	Constituency abolished. See Dublin Bay North			
