= Daniel Browne (Irish politician) =

Irish politician (1936–2023)

Lord Mayor of Dublin
- In office 1982–1983
- Preceded by: Alexis FitzGerald Jnr
- Succeeded by: Michael Keating

Personal details
- Born: Dublin, Ireland
- Died: 30 October 2010 Dublin, Ireland
- Party: Labour Party
- Spouse: Maureen Browne

Daniel Browne (died 30 October 2010) was an Irish Labour Party politician and trade unionist. He was a member of Dublin City Council from 1979 to 1985.

He was elected at the 1979 local elections for the North Inner City electoral area. He served as Lord Mayor of Dublin from 1982 to 1983. He did not contest the 1985 local elections. He was a member of the ATGWU.

On 28 August 1982, Browne officially opened the Frank Sherwin Bridge in Dublin, and became the first person to drive a car across it.

Civic offices
Preceded by Alexis FitzGerald Jnr	Lord Mayor of Dublin; 1982–1983	Succeeded by Michael Keating
