= 1991 Waterford County Council election =

Part of the 1991 Irish local elections

- 27 June 1991

All 23 seats to Waterford County Council
	First party	Second party	Third party
Party	Fianna Fáil	Fine Gael	Labour
Seats won	10	9	3
Seat change	-1	-1	+1
	Fourth party
Party	Workers' Party
Seats won	1
Seat change	+1
- Map showing the area of Waterford County Council
Council control after election
TBD

An election to Waterford County Council took place on 27 June 1991 as part of that year's Irish local elections. 23 councillors were elected from four local electoral areas (LEAs) for a five-year term of office on the electoral system of proportional representation by means of the single transferable vote (PR-STV). This term was extended twice, first to 1998, then to 1999.

== Results by party ==
Party	Seats	±	First Pref. votes	FPv%	±%
Fianna Fáil	10	-1	10,163	43.29	
Fine Gael	9	-1	7,587	32.32	
Labour	3	+1	3,291	14.02	
Workers' Party	1	+1	636	2.71	
Totals	23	0	23,475	100.00	—

== Results by local electoral area ==
=== Dungarvan ===
Dungarvan - 7 seats
Party	Candidate	FPv%	Count											
Party	Candidate	FPv%	1	2	3	4	5	6	7	8	9	10	11	12
Labour	Billy Kyne*	14.7%	1,009											
Fianna Fáil	Patrick Kenneally*	14.1%	969											
Fine Gael	Garry O'Halloran*	10%	686	690	709	709	718	724	783	858				
Labour	Lar Hart	7.2%	491	543	544	544	560	583	594	610	631	642	716	724
Workers' Party	Tony Wright	7%	482	505	507	510	516	545	556	567	596	609	695	702
Fine Gael	Richard Walsh	6.8%	469	479	482	486	490	516	574	610	643	662	887	
Fine Gael	Michael O'Riordan*	6.5%	446	463	464	465	472	492	542	557	592	606		
Independent	Sean Whelan*	6.2%	422	427	435	439	450	472	482	512	582	640	690	699
Fianna Fáil	Austin Flynn	5.6%	382	390	399	402	441	454	473	491	611	755	800	805
Fianna Fáil	Paud O'Keeffe	5.1%	349	351	377	377	402	405	409	440	499			
Fianna Fáil	Nuala Ryan	4.5%	306	315	326	331	374	384	388	406				
Progressive Democrats	James Coll	3.8%	263	265	270	271	276	287	299					
Fine Gael	Mario Flavin	3.2%	221	225	228	229	231	247						
Independent	Dan Dineen	2.6%	181	187	188	194	200							
Fianna Fáil	Willie John Kenneally	2.2%	154	162	184	184								
Independent	Benny Queally	0.4%	30	31	31									
Electorate: 10,669 Valid: 6,860 (64.30%) Spoilt: 40 Quota: 858 Turnout: 6,900 (64.67%)

=== Kilmacthomas ===
Kilmacthomas - 5 seats
Party	Candidate	FPv%	Count							
Party	Candidate	FPv%	1	2	3	4	5	6	7	8
Fianna Fáil	Jackie Fahey TD*	20.9%	1,066							
Fianna Fáil	Kieran O'Ryan*	15.8%	807	876						
Fine Gael	Oliver Coffey*	16.46	703	716	716	720	774	801	855	
Fine Gael	Patrick Coffey*	12.8%	654	666	668	707	715	730	762	789
Fianna Fáil	Tom Cunningham*	11.4%	583	629	639	658	697	739	976	
Labour	Victor Bowers	15.24	493	502	503	529	546	618	642	661
Fianna Fáil	Kathleen Whelan	6.2%	318	349	360	404	416	462		
Labour	Raymond Kelly	4%	204	212	212	213	217			
Independent	Dan Dineen	2.7%	140	148	148	148				
Fianna Fáil	Paul Kelly	2.5%	125	145	148					
Electorate: 8,239 Valid: 5,092 (61.8%) Spoilt: 61 Quota: 849 Turnout: 5,153 (62.5%)

=== Lismore ===
Lismore - 4 seats
Party	Candidate	FPv%	Count			
Party	Candidate	FPv%	1	2	3	4
Fianna Fáil	Ollie Wilkinson*	31.3%	1,287			
Fine Gael	Willie McDonnell*	27.1%	1,116			
Fianna Fáil	James Quirke*	16%	660	842		
Fine Gael	Matthew Power	10.3%	424	497	601	681
Fine Gael	Nora Flynn	10.2%	421	503	637	716
Fianna Fáil	Mary Ryan	5%	207	333	387	
Electorate: 6,263 Valid: 4,115 (65.7%) Spoilt: 41 Quota: 824 Turnout: 4,156 (66.4%)

=== Tramore ===
Tramore - 7 seats
Party	Candidate	FPv%	Count											
Party	Candidate	FPv%	1	2	3	4	5	6	7	8	9	10	11	12
Labour	Brian O'Shea TD*	14.77%	1,094											
Fianna Fáil	Pat Leahy*	14.75%	1,093											
Fine Gael	Michael Queally*	11.02%	816	822	858	872	910	940						
Fine Gael	John Carey*	10.19%	755	764	766	773	780	791	804	806	827	1,011		
Fianna Fáil	Dan Cowman	7.56%	560	593	615	627	695	748	801	804	995			
Fianna Fáil	Geoff Power*	7.19%	533	537	552	557	580	600	614	616	675	821	858	882
Progressive Democrats	Senator Martin Cullen	6.33%	469	488	495	511	520	560	639	642	687	737	746	753
Fine Gael	Noel McDonagh	6.13%	454	459	462	470	474	478	492	492	499			
Fine Gael	Con Casey*	5.7%	422	449	452	461	480	496	590	593	660	720	742	795
Fianna Fáil	Billy Hutchinson	4.54%	336	350	359	369	397	432	481	481				
Independent	Maureen O'Carroll	3.97%	294	315	317	343	360	382						
Fianna Fáil	Seamus Dunphy*	2.9%	215	224	251	257								
Fianna Fáil	Peter Griffin	2.88%	213	218	240	270	291							
Workers' Party	Edward Gahan	2.08%	154	169	187									
Electorate: 12,642 Valid: 7,408 (58.6%%) Spoilt: 54 Quota: 927 Turnout: 7,462 (59.03%)
