= Jim Tunney (Irish politician) =

Irish politician (1923–2002)

Minister of State
- 1977–1981: Education

Parliamentary Secretary
- 1973: Education

Leas-Cheann Comhairle of Dáil Éireann
- In office 24 March 1987 – 4 January 1993
- Ceann Comhairle: Seán Treacy
- Preceded by: John Ryan
- Succeeded by: Joe Jacob
- In office 7 July 1981 – 14 December 1982
- Ceann Comhairle: John O'Connell
- Preceded by: Seán Browne
- Succeeded by: John Ryan

Teachta Dála
- In office June 1977 – June 1981
- Constituency: Dublin Finglas
- In office June 1981 – November 1992
- In office June 1969 – June 1977
- Constituency: Dublin North-West

Lord Mayor of Dublin
- In office June 1984 – June 1985
- Preceded by: Michael O'Halloran
- Succeeded by: Bertie Ahern

Personal details
- Born: James Tunney; 25 December 1923 Dublin, Ireland
- Died: 16 January 2002 (aged 78) Dublin, Ireland
- Party: Fianna Fáil
- Spouse: Cathleen Byrne (m. 1957)
- Children: 4
- Parent: James Tunney (father)
- Education: University College Dublin

James C. Tunney (25 December 1924 – 16 January 2002) was an Irish Fianna Fáil politician.

== Early and personal life ==
He was born 25 December 1924 in Finglas, Dublin, the fourth child among three sons and five daughters of James Tunney, a farmer and Labour Party TD and senator, and M. Ellen Tunney (née Grimes), who both came from outside Westport, County Mayo. He was educated at St. Vincent's C.B.S. in Glasnevin.

He worked in the Department of Agriculture from 1943 to 1955 and it was in this period that he studied part-time at University College Dublin, where he took a BA in drama, English, and Irish before studying for a postgraduate qualification in Irish. From 1955 to 1962 he taught drama at VECs in Lucan, Balbriggan, and Garretstown, before being appointed headmaster of Blanchardstown VEC in 1962.

He also played at senior level for the Dublin county team. He was on the winning side for Dublin in the 1948 All-Ireland Junior Football Championship.

A snappy dresser who earned the nickname – the yellow rose of Finglas, he was sometimes seen as pompous, a perception possibly attributable to his acting background, which once led to an audition for Dublin's Abbey Theatre.

== Politics ==
In 1963 he joined Fianna Fáil, and stood for the party at the 1965 general election but was not elected. He was elected to Dáil Éireann as a Fianna Fáil Teachta Dála (TD) for the Dublin North-West constituency at the 1969 general election. He served continuously in the Dáil until losing his seat at the 1992 general election, having been a TD for Dublin Finglas from 1977 to 1981 when Dublin constituencies were reconfigured as 3-seaters, before being returned for Dublin North-West in 1981.

During that period he served as Parliamentary Secretary to the Minister for Education (after 1978, Minister of State at the Department of Education) in three governments. He served as Leas-Cheann Comhairle of Dáil Éireann from 1981 to 1982, and from 1987 to 1993. He was also chair of the Fianna Fáil parliamentary party for ten years. He was a member of Dublin City Council, and served as Lord Mayor of Dublin from 1984 to 1985.

Political offices
Preceded by Michael O'Kennedy	Parliamentary Secretary to the Minister for Education; Jan.–Feb. 1973	Succeeded by John Bruton
Preceded by John Bruton	Minister of State at the Department of Education; 1977–1981	Succeeded by Michael Keating
Preceded by John Ryan	Leas-Cheann Comhairle of Dáil Éireann; 1987–1993	Succeeded by Joe Jacob
Party political offices
Preceded by Seán Browne	Chair of the Fianna Fáil parliamentary party 1982–1992	Succeeded by Joe Jacob
Civic offices
Preceded by Michael O'Halloran	Lord Mayor of Dublin; 1984–1985	Succeeded by Bertie Ahern

Dáil	Election	Deputy (Party)	Deputy (Party)	Deputy (Party)	Deputy (Party)
2nd	1921	Philip Cosgrave (SF)	Joseph McGrath (SF)	Richard Mulcahy (SF)	Michael Staines (SF)
3rd	1922	Philip Cosgrave (PT-SF)	Joseph McGrath (PT-SF)	Richard Mulcahy (PT-SF)	Michael Staines (PT-SF)
4th	1923	Constituency abolished. See Dublin North			

Dáil	Election	Deputy (Party)	Deputy (Party)	Deputy (Party)	Deputy (Party)	Deputy (Party)
9th	1937	Seán T. O'Kelly (FF)	A. P. Byrne (Ind.)	Cormac Breathnach (FF)	Patrick McGilligan (FG)	Archie Heron (Lab)
10th	1938	Seán T. O'Kelly (FF)	A. P. Byrne (Ind.)	Cormac Breathnach (FF)	Patrick McGilligan (FG)	Eamonn Cooney (FF)
11th	1943	Seán T. O'Kelly (FF)	A. P. Byrne (Ind.)	Cormac Breathnach (FF)	Patrick McGilligan (FG)	Martin O'Sullivan (Lab)
12th	1944	Seán T. O'Kelly (FF)	John S. O'Connor (FF)	Cormac Breathnach (FF)	Patrick McGilligan (FG)	Martin O'Sullivan (Lab)
12th	1945 by-election	Vivion de Valera (FF)	John S. O'Connor (FF)	Cormac Breathnach (FF)	Patrick McGilligan (FG)	Martin O'Sullivan (Lab)
13th	1948	Mick Fitzpatrick (CnaP)	A. P. Byrne (Ind.)	Cormac Breathnach (FF)	3 seats from 1948 to 1969	
14th	1951	Declan Costello (FG)	A. P. Byrne (Ind.)	Cormac Breathnach (FF)	3 seats from 1948 to 1969	
14th	1952 by-election	Declan Costello (FG)	Thomas Byrne (Ind.)	Cormac Breathnach (FF)	3 seats from 1948 to 1969	
15th	1954	Declan Costello (FG)	Thomas Byrne (Ind.)	Richard Gogan (FF)	3 seats from 1948 to 1969	
16th	1957	Declan Costello (FG)	Thomas Byrne (Ind.)	Richard Gogan (FF)	3 seats from 1948 to 1969	
17th	1961	Declan Costello (FG)	Michael Mullen (Lab)	Richard Gogan (FF)	3 seats from 1948 to 1969	
18th	1965	Declan Costello (FG)	Michael Mullen (Lab)	Richard Gogan (FF)	3 seats from 1948 to 1969	
19th	1969	Hugh Byrne (FG)	Jim Tunney (FF)	Richard Gogan (FF)	David Thornley (Lab)	4 seats from 1969 to 1977
20th	1973	Hugh Byrne (FG)	Jim Tunney (FF)	Richard Gogan (FF)	David Thornley (Lab)	4 seats from 1969 to 1977
21st	1977	Constituency abolished. See Dublin Finglas and Dublin Cabra				

Dáil	Election	Deputy (Party)	Deputy (Party)	Deputy (Party)	Deputy (Party)
22nd	1981	Jim Tunney (FF)	Michael Barrett (FF)	Mary Flaherty (FG)	Hugh Byrne (FG)
23rd	1982 (Feb)	Jim Tunney (FF)	Michael Barrett (FF)	Mary Flaherty (FG)	Proinsias De Rossa (WP)
24th	1982 (Nov)	Jim Tunney (FF)	Michael Barrett (FF)	Mary Flaherty (FG)	Proinsias De Rossa (WP)
25th	1987	Jim Tunney (FF)	Michael Barrett (FF)	Mary Flaherty (FG)	Proinsias De Rossa (WP)
26th	1989	Jim Tunney (FF)	Michael Barrett (FF)	Mary Flaherty (FG)	Proinsias De Rossa (WP)
27th	1992	Noel Ahern (FF)	Róisín Shortall (Lab)	Mary Flaherty (FG)	Proinsias De Rossa (DL)
28th	1997	Noel Ahern (FF)	Róisín Shortall (Lab)	Pat Carey (FF)	Proinsias De Rossa (DL)
29th	2002	Noel Ahern (FF)	Róisín Shortall (Lab)	Pat Carey (FF)	3 seats from 2002
30th	2007	Noel Ahern (FF)	Róisín Shortall (Lab)	Pat Carey (FF)	3 seats from 2002
31st	2011	Dessie Ellis (SF)	Róisín Shortall (Lab)	John Lyons (Lab)	3 seats from 2002
32nd	2016	Dessie Ellis (SF)	Róisín Shortall (SD)	Noel Rock (FG)	3 seats from 2002
33rd	2020	Dessie Ellis (SF)	Róisín Shortall (SD)	Paul McAuliffe (FF)	3 seats from 2002
34th	2024	Dessie Ellis (SF)	Rory Hearne (SD)	Paul McAuliffe (FF)	3 seats from 2002

Dáil	Election	Deputy (Party)	Deputy (Party)	Deputy (Party)
21st	1977	Jim Tunney (FF)	Bertie Ahern (FF)	Luke Belton (FG)
22nd	1981	Constituency abolished		
