= 1991 Waterford Corporation election =

Part of the 1991 Irish local elections

- 27 June 1991

All 15 seats to Waterford City Council
	First party	Second party	Third party
Party	Fianna Fáil	Fine Gael	Labour
Seats won	3	2	3
Seat change	-2	-2	+1
	Fourth party	Fifth party	Sixth party
Party	Workers' Party	Progressive Democrats	Independent
Seats won	3	2	2
Seat change	+1	+2	0
- Map showing the area of Waterford City Council
Council control after election
TBD

An election to Waterford City Council took place on 27 June 1991 as part of that year's Irish local elections. 15 councillors were elected from three local electoral areas (LEAs) for a five-year term of office on the electoral system of proportional representation by means of the single transferable vote (PR-STV). This term was extended twice, first to 1998, then to 1999.

== Results by party ==
Party	Seats	±	First Pref. votes	FPv%	±%
Fianna Fáil	3	-2	3,165	19.01	
Fine Gael	2	-2	2,220	13.34	
Labour	3	+1	3,415	20.50	
Workers' Party	3	+1	3,359	20.18	
Progressive Democrats	2	+2	1,666	10.01	
Independent	2	0	2,360	14.20	
Totals	15	0	16,645	100.00	—

== Results by local electoral area ==
=== Waterford No.1 ===
Waterford No.1 - 5 seats
Party	Candidate	FPv%	Count						
Party	Candidate	FPv%	1	2	3	4	5	6	7
Labour	Pat Hayes	19.9%	997						
Fine Gael	Hilary Quinlan*	13.4%	669	694	715	739	797	834	
Workers' Party	Davy Walsh*	12.5%	625	658	670	742	828	843	
Fine Gael	James Brett*	9.3%	463	472	479	486	493	515	537
Fianna Fáil	Patrick Power*	9.2%	459	472	525	549	565	809	849
Progressive Democrats	Senator Martin Cullen	8.4%	419	437	449	467	515	545	600
Progressive Democrats	Billy McCarthy	6.2%	309	337	341	383	433	442	
Fianna Fáil	Larry Dower	6%	299	305	367	380	401		
Independent	Val White	5.7%	286	303	323	360			
Sinn Féin	Noel Ryan	5.5%	273	281	288				
Fianna Fáil	Joe Guilfoyle	4%	201	207					
Electorate: 7,945 Valid: 5,000 (62.93%) Spoilt: 55 Quota: 834 Turnout: 5,055 (63.62%)

=== Waterford No.2 ===
Waterford No.2 - 5 seats
Party	Candidate	FPv%	Count						
Party	Candidate	FPv%	1	2	3	4	5	6	7
Independent	Davy Daniels*	21.5%	1,174						
Labour	Liam Curham*	15.8%	862	916					
Fianna Fáil	Brendan Kenneally TD*	13.2%	720	761	769	803	974		
Independent	Stephen Rogers*	11%	597	662	694	769	829	991	
Progressive Democrats	Brian Cunningham	10.6%	579	607	628	668	687	829	896
Workers' Party	Olga Redmond	8.9%	484	501	527	580	597	676	691
Fine Gael	Michael Lane	5.9%	319	335	407	446	466		
Fianna Fáil	Frank King	5.2%	283	298	308	322			
Independent	Brian Jones	4.7%	257	278	285				
Fine Gael	George Power	3.2%	175	183					
Electorate: 9,189 Valid: 5,450 (59.31%) Spoilt: 49 Quota: 909 Turnout: 5,489 (59.73%)

=== Waterford No.3 ===
Waterford No.3 - 5 seats
Party	Candidate	FPv%	Count							
Party	Candidate	FPv%	1	2	3	4	5	6	7	8
Labour	Brian O'Shea TD*	25.1%	1,556							
Workers' Party	Paddy Gallagher*	17.5%	1,082							
Workers' Party	Martin O'Regan*	12.7%	784	898	953	971	1,009	1,098		
Fine Gael	Maurice Cummins	9.6%	594	699	720	724	760	798	801	885
Fianna Fáil	Tom Browne*	7.8%	482	532	560	562	720	958	972	1,028
Fianna Fáil	Tom Murphy	6.2%	386	410	420	421	483			
Workers' Party	John Halligan	6.2%	384	461	498	515	536	552	561	
Progressive Democrats	Michelle O'Neill	5.8%	359	432	468	473	511	561	581	698
Fianna Fáil	Brian Swift*	5.4%	335	382	402	404				
Sinn Féin	Denis O'Brien	3%	187	204						
Independent	Paud Sweeney	0.7%	46	62						
Electorate: 10,360 Valid: 6,195 (59.8%) Spoilt: 57 Quota: 1,033 Turnout: 6,252 (60.35%)
