= Derek McDowell =

Irish former politician (born 1958)

Senator
- In office 12 September 2002 – 13 September 2007
- Constituency: Industrial and Commercial Panel

Teachta Dála
- In office November 1992 – May 2002
- Constituency: Dublin North-Central

Personal details
- Born: 11 September 1958 (age 67) Dublin, Ireland
- Party: Labour Party

Derek McDowell (born 11 September 1958) is an Irish former Labour Party politician. He was a Teachta Dála (TD) from 1992 to 2002, and member of Seanad Éireann from 2002 to 2007.

McDowell was an unsuccessful candidate at the 1989 general election in the Dublin North-Central constituency, but at the 1992 general election he was returned to the 27th Dáil, topping the poll with 23% of the first-preference votes. He was re-elected at the 1997 general election with a much reduced share of the vote. At the 1999 Irish local elections, he was elected to Dublin City Council from the Clontarf area.

At the 2002 general election, McDowell lost his seat to the independent candidate Finian McGrath. After the loss of his seat in Dáil Éireann, McDowell was elected to the 22nd Seanad by the Industrial and Commercial Panel, where he was Labour's Seanad spokesperson on Finance, Transport, Enterprise, Trade and Employment. At the 2007 general election, he stood again in the Dublin North–Central constituency, but did not regain his seat. He did not contest the subsequent elections to the 23rd Seanad.

McDowell worked as Head of International Advocacy at Concern Worldwide. During the 2011 to 2016 Fine Gael–Labour Party coalition he served as deputy government press secretary and advisor to Tánaiste Eamon Gilmore and Tánaiste Joan Burton.

Dáil	Election	Deputy (Party)	Deputy (Party)	Deputy (Party)	Deputy (Party)
13th	1948	Vivion de Valera (FF)	Martin O'Sullivan (Lab)	Patrick McGilligan (FG)	3 seats 1948–1961
14th	1951	Vivion de Valera (FF)	Colm Gallagher (FF)	Patrick McGilligan (FG)	3 seats 1948–1961
15th	1954	Vivion de Valera (FF)	Maureen O'Carroll (Lab)	Patrick McGilligan (FG)	3 seats 1948–1961
16th	1957	Vivion de Valera (FF)	Colm Gallagher (FF)	Patrick McGilligan (FG)	3 seats 1948–1961
16th	1957 by-election	Vivion de Valera (FF)	Frank Sherwin (Ind.)	Patrick McGilligan (FG)	3 seats 1948–1961
17th	1961	Vivion de Valera (FF)	Frank Sherwin (Ind.)	Patrick McGilligan (FG)	Celia Lynch (FF)
18th	1965	Vivion de Valera (FF)	Michael O'Leary (Lab)	Luke Belton (FG)	Celia Lynch (FF)
19th	1969	George Colley (FF)	Michael O'Leary (Lab)	Luke Belton (FG)	Celia Lynch (FF)
20th	1973	George Colley (FF)	Michael O'Leary (Lab)	Luke Belton (FG)	Celia Lynch (FF)
21st	1977	Vincent Brady (FF)	Michael O'Leary (Lab)	Michael Keating (FG)	3 seats 1977–1981
22nd	1981	Vincent Brady (FF)	Charles Haughey (FF)	Noël Browne (SLP)	George Birmingham (FG)
23rd	1982 (Feb)	Vincent Brady (FF)	Charles Haughey (FF)	Richard Bruton (FG)	George Birmingham (FG)
24th	1982 (Nov)	Vincent Brady (FF)	Charles Haughey (FF)	Richard Bruton (FG)	George Birmingham (FG)
25th	1987	Vincent Brady (FF)	Charles Haughey (FF)	Richard Bruton (FG)	George Birmingham (FG)
26th	1989	Vincent Brady (FF)	Charles Haughey (FF)	Richard Bruton (FG)	Ivor Callely (FF)
27th	1992	Seán Haughey (FF)	Derek McDowell (Lab)	Richard Bruton (FG)	Ivor Callely (FF)
28th	1997	Seán Haughey (FF)	Derek McDowell (Lab)	Richard Bruton (FG)	Ivor Callely (FF)
29th	2002	Seán Haughey (FF)	Finian McGrath (Ind.)	Richard Bruton (FG)	Ivor Callely (FF)
30th	2007	Seán Haughey (FF)	Finian McGrath (Ind.)	Richard Bruton (FG)	3 seats from 2007
31st	2011	Aodhán Ó Ríordáin (Lab)	Finian McGrath (Ind.)	Richard Bruton (FG)	3 seats from 2007
32nd	2016	Constituency abolished. See Dublin Bay North			
