= 1991 Westmeath County Council election =

Part of the 1991 Irish local elections

← 1985	27 June 1991	1999 →

All 23 seats to Westmeath County Council
	First party	Second party	Third party
Party	Fianna Fáil	Fine Gael	Labour
Seats won	12	6	4
Seat change	-1	+1	+1
	Fourth party
Party	Independent
Seats won	1
Seat change	-1
- Map showing the area of Westmeath County Council
Council control before election
Fianna Fáil
Council control after election
Fianna Fáil

An election to Westmeath County Council took place on 27 June 1991 as part of that year's Irish local elections. 23 councillors were elected from five local electoral areas (LEAs) for a five-year term of office on the electoral system of proportional representation by means of the single transferable vote (PR-STV). This term was extended twice, first to 1998, then to 1999.

== Results by party ==
Party	Seats	±	First Pref. votes	FPv%	±%
Fianna Fáil	12	-1	12,247	44.26	
Fine Gael	6	+1	7,561	27.33	
Labour	4	+1	5,063	18.30	
Independent	1	-1	2,415	8.70	
Totals	23	-	27,670	100.00	—

== Results by local electoral area ==
=== Athlone ===
Athlone - 7 seats
Party	Candidate	FPv%	Count															
Party	Candidate	FPv%	1	2	3	4	5	6	7	8	9	10	11	12	13	14	15	16
Fianna Fáil	Senator Seán Fallon*	13%	1,140															
Fine Gael	Brendan McFadden*	9.3%	817	821	831	839	860	906	962	988	1,064	1,070	1,180					
Fianna Fáil	P.J. Coghill*	8.4%	737	740	742	746	753	758	762	764	834	882	896	897	912	932	940	981
Independent	Stephen Price*	7.9%	693	694	713	719	729	736	742	778	792	931	952	956	1,009	1,228		
Fianna Fáil	Kieran Molloy	7.5%	660	668	671	684	701	707	734	766	774	812	846	857	943	959	966	1,033
Fianna Fáil	Kieran Temple*	6.5%	575	582	583	590	600	621	629	641	647	672	712	729	764	774	782	826
Fianna Fáil	Egbert Moran	5.3%	463	467	469	477	480	510	517	522	531	591	643	648	662	675	680	782
Fine Gael	George Allen*	4.7%	415	416	423	424	435	477	480	484	537	581	636	652	664	837	895	998
Fianna Fáil	George Ledwidth*	4.5%	399	401	407	408	414	416	419	425	432							
Fine Gael	Pauline Coghlan	4.3%	381	382	392	393	394	417	417	422	486	525	545	558	567			
Labour	John Henson	4.3%	377	379	400	410	427	441	507	533	555	563	587	594	646	670	673	
Progressive Democrats	Des Lynch	4.1%	364	365	367	372	377	402	412	425	437	445						
Fine Gael	Vincent Dooley	3.8%	332	333	336	337	352	367	371	379								
Independent	Patsy Beaumont	2.9%	255	257	263	282	327	330	363	450	460	462	484	491				
Fine Gael	Dick O'Brien	2.7%	241	243	244	246												
Independent	Austin Berry	2.7%	234	235	245	285	321	324	337									
Labour	John Keenehan	2.6%	230	231	237	244	250	250										
Independent	Oliver Gavin	2.4%	209	210	217	226												
Independent	John Kearney	1.6%	144	145	147													
Labour	David Dolan	0.9%	82	82														
Independent	Benny Cooney	0.5%	43	43														
Electorate: 15,813 Valid: 8,790 (55.59%) Spoilt: 71 Quota: 1,099 Turnout: 8,861 (56.04%)

=== Coole ===
Coole - 4 seats
Party	Candidate	FPv%	Count						
Party	Candidate	FPv%	1	2	3	4	5	6	7
Fianna Fáil	Senator Donie Cassidy*	18.3%	897	921	933	1,021			
Fianna Fáil	P.J. O'Shaughnessy*	14.7%	720	725	731	816	857	880	1,000
Fianna Fáil	Thomas Bourke*	12.8%	628	630	714	753	768	870	878
Fine Gael	Frank McDermott*	12.1%	594	617	644	702	728	764	1,007
Fine Gael	Phil Brennan	10.3%	504	507	561	578	580	672	748
Fine Gael	Maura Drum	8.7%	429	435	443	466	470	493	
Labour	Johnnie Penrose	7.8%	381	421	463	469	470		
Fianna Fáil	Molly Cahill	7.6%	372	385	391				
Independent	Kevin Boyhan	5.2%	255	258					
Labour	Johnny McCormack	2.5%	125						
Electorate: 7,178 Valid: 4,905 (68.33%) Spoilt: 45 Quota: 982 Turnout: 4,950 (68.96%)

=== Kilbeggan ===
Kilbeggan - 4 seats
Party	Candidate	FPv%	Count						
Party	Candidate	FPv%	1	2	3	4	5	6	7
Fine Gael	Joe Flanagan*	23.2%	1,124						
Fianna Fáil	Tom Cowley	17.3%	837	841	925	942	1,163		
Labour	Mark Nugent*	16.9%	820	832	874	954	1,188		
Fianna Fáil	Michael Ryan*	13.6%	659	705	718	724	815	866	1,043
Fianna Fáil	Christo Bradley	10.9%	529	536	547	593			
Fine Gael	Mary Fallon	7%	340	397	440	630	644	678	682
Fine Gael	Mary Henry	7%	321	345	360				
Fine Gael	Gerald Cooney	4.5%	218	222					
Electorate: 7,331 Valid: 4,848 (66.13%) Spoilt: 54 Quota: 970 Turnout: 4,902 (66.87%)

=== Mullingar Lough Owel ===
Mullingar Lough Owel - 4 seats
Party	Candidate	FPv%	Count						
Party	Candidate	FPv%	1	2	3	4	5	6	7
Labour	Willie Penrose*	24.1%	1,170						
Fianna Fáil	Henry Abbott*	22.6%	1,101						
Fine Gael	John Keegan	16.9%	821	854	864	909	978		
Fianna Fáil	Tommy Wright	12.1%	587	619	654	689	700	700	1,043
Fianna Fáil	Shay Callaghan*	9.1%	444	470	527	568	574	574	
Fine Gael	Frank Wallace	7.6%	371	424	440	455	574	579	624
Fine Gael	Tommy Moughty	4.3%	210	239	243	247			
Independent	Robert Bagnall	3.3%	160	184	190				
Electorate: 8,054 Valid: 4,864 (60.39%) Spoilt: 40 Quota: 973 Turnout: 4,904 (60.89%)

=== Mullingar Urban ===
Mullingar Urban - 4 seats
Party	Candidate	FPv%	Count							
Party	Candidate	FPv%	1	2	3	4	5	6	7	8
Labour	Mick Dollard*	39.6%	1,688							
Fianna Fáil	Camillus Glynn*	14.1%	603	674	674	679	700	714	764	874
Fine Gael	Paul McGrath TD	12.1%	517	578	578	579	615	695	747	836
Fianna Fáil	Martin Hynes*	11.8%	501	553	554	555	565	576	623	719
Fianna Fáil	Jim Bourke	6.5%	275	304	304	304	328	349	372	
Labour	Des Coleman*	4.5%	190	678	679	689	710	732	810	845
Independent	Frank McIntyre*	4.3%	183	266	268	272	290	307		
Fine Gael	Jim Guinan	3.4%	144	160	161	164	177			
Progressive Democrats	Pat Whelan	3.3%	141	160	160	163				
Workers' Party	Patrick Boyce	0.4%	19	30	31					
Independent	Benedict Cooney	0%	2	7						
Electorate: 11,119 Valid: 5,731 (51.54%) Spoilt: 78 Quota: 956 Turnout: 5,809 (52.24%)
