= 1985 Clare County Council election =

Part of the 1985 Irish local elections

← 1979	20 June 1985	1991 →

All 32 seats on Clare County Council
	First party	Second party	Third party
Party	Fianna Fáil	Fine Gael	Labour
Seats won	17	8	2
Seat change	0	-1	0
	Fourth party
Party	Independent
Seats won	5
Seat change	+2
- Map showing the area of Clare County Council
Council control before election
Fianna Fáil
Council control after election
Fianna Fáil

An election to Clare County Council took place on 20 June 1985 as part of that year's Irish local elections. 32 councillors were elected from six local electoral areas (LEAs) for a five-year term of office on the electoral system of proportional representation by means of the single transferable vote (PR-STV). This term was extended for a further year, to 1991.

== Results by party ==
Party	Seats	±	First Pref. votes	FPv%	±%
Fianna Fáil	17	0	23,382	53.52	
Fine Gael	8	-1	10,232	23.42	
Labour	2	0	2,256	5.16	
Independent	5	+2	7,629	17.46	
Totals	32	+1	43,393	100.00	—

== Results by local electoral area ==
=== Ennis ===
Ennis: 4 seats
Party	Candidate	FPv%	Count					
Party	Candidate	FPv%	1	2	3	4	5	6
Independent	Tommy Brennan		1,007					
Fianna Fáil	Frank Barrett		827	845	864	892	917	
Fianna Fáil	Bobby Burke		673	693	716	741	777	825
Fine Gael	Michael Howard*		627	648	679	772	1,044	
Fianna Fáil	Peter Considine		606	627	642	661	691	742
Fine Gael	Angela Coughlan		334	345	368	422		
Labour	Flan Honan		228	238	280			
Workers' Party	Dermot Hayes		186	194				
Electorate: 8,261 Valid: 4,488 (55.11%) Spoilt: 65 Quota: 898 Turnout: 4,553

=== Ennistymon ===
Ennistymon: 5 seats
Party	Candidate	FPv%	Count						
Party	Candidate	FPv%	1	2	3	4	5	6	7
Fianna Fáil	Tony Killeen		1,284						
Fine Gael	Frank Henchy*		1,120	1,127	1,134	1,472			
Fianna Fáil	Enda Mulkere		1,029	1,052	1,060	1,081	1,128	1,135	1,440
Labour	Martin Lafferty*		1,027	1,036	1,043	1,216			
Fianna Fáil	Jimmy Nagle*		932	951	955	1,009	1,057	1,086	1,730
Fianna Fáil	Jack Lynch*		887	946	956	994	1,044	1,062	
Fine Gael	Bill Slattery		645	649	652				
Independent	Joseph Meehan		47	48					
Electorate: 9,782 Valid: 6,971 (71.72%) Spoilt: 45 Quota: 1,162 Turnout: 7,016

=== Killaloe ===
Killaloe: 6 seats
Party	Candidate	FPv%	Count				
Party	Candidate	FPv%	1	2	3	4	5
Independent	John Minogue*		1,545				
Fianna Fáil	Colm Wiley*		1,385				
Fianna Fáil	Joe Gorman		1,295	1,360			
Fine Gael	Patrick Bugler*		1,208	1,266	1,497		
Fine Gael	Tony McMahon*		1,197	1,221	1,248	1,278	1,286
Fianna Fáil	Michael Begley		1,038	1,044	1,131	1,150	1,201
Fianna Fáil	Harry Brannn*		885	900	1,251	1,361	
Fianna Fáil	Eoin Maloney		726	777			
Electorate: 13,372 Valid: 9,279 (69.89%) Spoilt: 367 Quota: 1,326 Turnout: 9,346

=== Kilrush ===
Kilrush: 6 seats
Party	Candidate	FPv%	Count								
Party	Candidate	FPv%	1	2	3	4	5	6	7	8	9
Fianna Fáil	P.J. Kelly		1,099	1,106	1,203	1,219	1,220	1,275			
Fianna Fáil	Bill Chambers		1,084	1,108	1,234	1,280					
Fine Gael	Madeleine Taylor-Quinn TD*		955	1,079	1,091	1,213	1,217	1,301			
Fine Gael	Jackie Keane*		872	923	1,039	1,059	1,061	1,081	1,085	1,452	
Fianna Fáil	Seán Keating*		820	846	877	998	1,006	1,135	1,143	1,249	
Independent	William O'Looney		756	771	772	803	804	991	1,021	1,090	1,157
Fianna Fáil	Michael Flynn		562	584	625	660	666				
Fianna Fáil	Martin Foran*		556	585	594	693	700	816	819	866	901
Independent	Sean Maloney		551	585	589						
Fine Gael	Sean Ryan		547	607	682	726	730	771			
Fianna Fáil	Timmy McMahon		514	519							
Fine Gael	Annette Burke		410								
Electorate: 11,784 Valid: 8,726 (74.54%) Spoilt: 58 Quota: 1,247 Turnout: 8,784

=== Miltown-Malbay ===
Miltown-Malbay: 6 seats
Party	Candidate	FPv%	Count					
Party	Candidate	FPv%	1	2	3	4	5	6
Independent	P.J. Burke*		1,408					
Independent	Christy Curtin*		1,249					
Fianna Fáil	James Breen		1,038	1,082	1,102	1,128	1,147	1,320
Fianna Fáil	Flan Garvey		974	1,010	1,024	1,044	1,053	1,133
Fine Gael	Donal Carey TD*		883	908	929	1,175		
Fianna Fáil	Haulie Daly		756	767	788	794	798	830
Fianna Fáil	Michael Hillery		617	668	672	752	792	1,165
Fianna Fáil	Timothy Sexton		603	657	659	707	736	
Fine Gael	P.J. Meade		404	436	447			
Independent	Basil Minihane		65	69				
Independent	Frank McTigue		36	39				
Electorate: 11,177 Valid: 8,033 (72.42%) Spoilt: 61 Quota: 1,148 Turnout: 8,094

=== Shannon ===
Shannon: 5 seats
Party	Candidate	FPv%	Count								
Party	Candidate	FPv%	1	2	3	4	5	6	7	8	9
Fianna Fáil	Pat McMahon*		1,103								
Labour	Patricia McCarthy*		1,001	1,006	1,026	1,074					
Fianna Fáil	Sean Driscoll		977	991	1,002	1,015	1,103				
Fianna Fáil	PJ Cunningham		568	586	631	632	648	662	705	769	
Fianna Fáil	Seán Hillery		544	561	577	593	636	666	702	863	1,267
Fine Gael	Sonny Scanlon		419	421	446	519	526	528	790	868	1,050
Independent	John Murray		404	407	427	427	540	554	594		
Fine Gael	Mary Donnelly		382	390	409	440	454	457			
Independent	Brigid Makowski		372	372	380	382					
Fine Gael	Joan Reddan		229	231	237						
Independent	JJ McCabe		189	191							
Electorate: 9,767 Valid: 6,188 (63.36%) Quota: 1,032
