= 1991 Clare County Council election =

Part of the 1991 Irish local elections

← 1985	27 June 1991	1999 →

All 32 seats on Clare County Council
	First party	Second party	Third party
Party	Fianna Fáil	Fine Gael	Labour
Seats won	17	8	1
Seat change	0	0	-1
	Fourth party	Fifth party
Party	Progressive Democrats	Independent
Seats won	1	5
Seat change	+1	0
- Map showing the area of Clare County Council
Council control before election
Fianna Fáil
Council control after election
Fianna Fáil

An election to Clare County Council took place on 27 June 1991 as part of that year's Irish local elections. 32 councillors were elected from six local electoral areas (LEAs) for a five-year term of office on the electoral system of proportional representation by means of the single transferable vote (PR-STV). This term was extended twice, first to 1998, then to 1999.

== Results by party ==
Party	Seats	±	First Pref. votes	FPv%	±%
Fianna Fáil	17	0	21,062	48.54	
Fine Gael	8	0	9,370	21.59	
Labour	1	-1	3,171	7.31	
Progressive Democrats	1	+1	2,627	6.05	
Independent	5	0	6,701	15.44	
Totals	32	0	43,393	100.00	—

== Results by local electoral area ==
=== Ennis ===
Ennis - 7 seats
Party	Candidate	FPv%	Count								
Party	Candidate	FPv%	1	2	3	4	5	6	7	8	9
Independent	Tommy Brennan*	22.3%	1,212								
Fianna Fáil	Raymond Greene	17.3%	942	966	990	1,039	1,120				
Fianna Fáil	Peter Considine	12.9%	702	722	735	749	870	932	1,026	1,056	1,266
Progressive Democrats	Frankie Neylon	11.0%	599	619	633	653	688	738	940	942	
Labour	Michael Corley	10.5%	569	585	599	630	648	694			
Fine Gael	Anna Mulqueen	8.2%	445	461	477	491	499	735	969	970	1,288
Fine Gael	Michael Howard*	7.2%	391	405	418	436	446				
Fianna Fáil	Josie Nevin	4.8%	263	270	274	287					
Sinn Féin	Tony McCarthy	3.5%	190	196	207						
Independent	Frank Kenny	2.2%	118	120							
Electorate: 10,739 Valid: 5,431 (50.57%) Spoilt: 39 Quota: 1,087 Turnout: 5,470 (50.94%)

=== Ennistymon ===
Ennistymon - 5 seats
Party	Candidate	FPv%	Count		
Party	Candidate	FPv%	1	2	3
Fianna Fáil	Tony Killeen*	21.1%	1,355		
Fine Gael	Frank Henchy*	9.43	1,258		
Labour	Martin Lafferty*	17.7%	1,142		
Fianna Fáil	Enda Mulkere*	17.5%	1,128		
Fianna Fáil	Jimmy Nagle*	15.3%	985	1,221	
Progressive Democrats	Noel Moran	4.8%	307	332	361
Fine Gael	Paddy O'Connor	4.0%	260	281	437
Electorate: 9,891 Valid: 6,435 (65.06%) Spoilt: 43 Quota: 1,073 Turnout: 6,478 (65.49%)

=== Killaloe ===
Killaloe - 6 seats
Party	Candidate	FPv%	Count								
Party	Candidate	FPv%	1	2	3	4	5	6	7	8	9
Fianna Fáil	Colm Wiley*	13.9%	1,377	1,429							
Progressive Democrats	Mary Mannion	11.0%	1,094	1,112	1,186	1,225	1,226	1,255	1,666		
Fianna Fáil	Michael Begley	10.8%	1,071	1,112	1,269	1,286	1,290	1,370	1,477		
Fine Gael	Patrick Bugler*	10.3%	1,019	1,036	1,055	1,257	1,258	1,387	1,431		
Fine Gael	Tony McMahon*	10.1%	999	1,010	1,085	1,176	1,176	1,189	1,270	1,399	1,419
Fianna Fáil	Joe Gorman*	10.1%	998	1,007	1,007	1,101	1,101	1,194	1,218	1,250	1,260
Labour	Brendan Hayes	7.3%	723	762	802	821	823	831			
Fianna Fáil	Pat Hayes	6.6%	657	677	728	776	779				
Fianna Fáil	Michael Torpey	6.2%	617	625	656	785	786	1,116	1,158	1,180	1,195
Fine Gael	Eugene Conlon	5.7%	566	571	578						
Fianna Fáil	Eugene Givinan	5.3%	524	542							
Sinn Féin	Tony Foley	2.7%	272								
Electorate: 13,913 Valid: 9,917 (71.28%) Spoilt: 69 Quota: 1,417 Turnout: 9,986 (71.77%)

=== Kilrush ===
Kilrush - 6 seats
Party	Candidate	FPv%	Count								
Party	Candidate	FPv%	1	2	3	4	5	6	7	8	9
Fianna Fáil	P.J. Kelly*	13.5%	1,080	1,080	1,117	1,135	1,161				
Fine Gael	Jackie Keane*	13.4%	1,072	1,073	1,189						
Fianna Fáil	Tom Prendeville	12.3%	987	992	995	1,047	1,298				
Fianna Fáil	Bill Chambers*	12.0%	963	964	978	1,041	1,122	1,151			
Fianna Fáil	Patrick Keane	11.5%	924	927	939	976	1,024	1,035	1,048	1,052	1,061
Fianna Fáil	Seán Keating*	10.9%	877	877	886	923	972	993	1,019	1,044	1,049
Fine Gael	Madeleine Taylor-Quinn TD*	10.5%	845	848	898	974	1,144	1,234			
Independent	William O'Looney*	7.5%	603	612	617	691					
Independent	Mossie Horgan	4.7%	380	391	398						
Fine Gael	Tom O'Brien	3.2%	257	257							
Independent	John O'Shea	0.4%	35								
Electorate: 11,610 Valid: 8,023 (69.10%) Spoilt: 66 Quota: 1,147 Turnout: 8,089 (69.67%)

=== Miltown-Malbay ===
Miltown-Malbay - 6 seats
Party	Candidate	FPv%	Count						
Party	Candidate	FPv%	1	2	3	4	5	6	7
Independent	Christy Curtin*	19.7%	1,416						
Fianna Fáil	Michael Hillery*	15.8%	1,132						
Independent	P.J. Burke*	15.1%	1,085						
Fianna Fáil	James Breen*	14.9%	1,072						
Fine Gael	Donal Carey TD*	11.8%	848	936	947	960	971	1,102	
Fianna Fáil	Flan Garvey*	8.2%	592	719	785	807	828	861	959
Fianna Fáil	Bernard Hanrahan	7.6%	549	580	595	601	611	652	674
Labour	Peadar McNamara	3.6%	256	299	302	310	313		
Fine Gael	Dick Pilkington	3.2%	229	330	341	351	352	376	
Electorate: 10,040 Valid: 7,179 (71.5%) Spoilt: 42 Quota: 1,026 Turnout: 7,221 (71.92%)

=== Shannon ===
Shannon - 5 seats
Party	Candidate	FPv%	Count										
Party	Candidate	FPv%	1	2	3	4	5	6	7	8	9	10	11
Independent	Patricia McCarthy*	15.0%	963	985	1,020	1,073							
Fianna Fáil	Pat McMahon*	14.7%	941	947	948	949	982	1,029	1,040	1,222			
Fine Gael	Sonny Scanlon*	10.6%	678	680	709	715	764	771	980	1,109			
Independent	Brigid Makowski	8.5%	545	608	621	632	638	688	699	726	734	955	1,004
Fianna Fáil	Pat O'Loughlin	8.4%	540	542	543	546	600	634	652	691	733	769	
Fianna Fáil	Seán Hillery*	7.7%	496	502	507	524	531	625	672	748	788	924	1,329
Labour	Tom O'Shaughnessy	7.5%	481	497	511	528	544	584	612	669	686		
Progressive Democrats	Tom Casey	7.1%	453	457	465	534	557	572	600				
Fine Gael	Mary Cusack	5.2%	336	338	380	380	383	388					
Fianna Fáil	Geraldine Lambert	4.5%	290	297	300	305	310						
Independent	J.J. McCabe	3.2%	204	204	206	208							
Progressive Democrats	Mary McGrath	2.7%	174	177	187								
Fine Gael	Dermot Hammond	2.6%	167	169									
Independent	Peter Flanagan	2.2%	140										
Electorate: 10,717 Valid: 6,408 (59.79%) Spoilt: 20 Quota: 1,069 Turnout: 6,428 (59.98%)
