= Alexis FitzGerald Jnr =

Irish politician (1945–2015)

Teachta Dála
- In office February 1982 – November 1982
- Constituency: Dublin South-East

Senator
- In office 23 February 1983 – 25 April 1987
- In office 8 October 1981 – 18 February 1982
- Constituency: Industrial and Commercial Panel

Lord Mayor of Dublin
- In office June 1981 – June 1982
- Preceded by: Fergus O'Brien
- Succeeded by: Daniel Browne

Personal details
- Born: 7 May 1945 Dublin, Ireland
- Died: 15 July 2015 (aged 70) Dublin, Ireland
- Party: Fine Gael
- Spouse: Mary Flaherty (m. 1980)
- Children: 4
- Relatives: Alexis FitzGerald Snr (uncle)

Alexis J. G. FitzGerald (7 May 1945 – 15 July 2015) was an Irish Fine Gael politician who served as a TD and Senator in the 1980s.

FitzGerald stood unsuccessfully for Dáil Éireann at the 1973 general election in Dublin Central, at the 1977 general election in Dublin South-Central, and at the 1981 general election in Dublin South.

FitzGerald then contested the 1981 Seanad election on the Industrial and Commercial Panel, and was returned to the 15th Seanad replacing his uncle Alexis FitzGerald Snr. In the same year he was elected Lord Mayor of Dublin.

FitzGerald was finally elected to the Dáil at the February 1982 general election, when he replaced the retiring Fine Gael TD Richie Ryan as a running-mate of party leader Garret FitzGerald (no relation) in the Dublin South-East constituency. He took his seat in the 23rd Dáil as a minority Fianna Fáil government took office under Charles Haughey, but after Haughey's government fell later that year, FitzGerald lost his Dáil seat to his Fine Gael colleague Joe Doyle at the November 1982 general election.

After his Dáil defeat, he stood again for election to the Seanad on the Industrial and Commercial Panel and was elected to the 17th Seanad. He left the Seanad at the next election in 1987 and returned to his previous career as an auctioneer and estate agent.

FitzGerald and his wife Mary Flaherty were both members of the 23rd Dáil, one of the few married couples to sit in the same Dáil.

He died in July 2015 at the age of 70.

== See also ==
- Families in the Oireachtas

Civic offices
Preceded by Fergus O'Brien	Lord Mayor of Dublin; 1981–1982	Succeeded by Daniel Browne

Dáil	Election	Deputy (Party)	Deputy (Party)	Deputy (Party)	Deputy (Party)
13th	1948	John A. Costello (FG)	Seán MacEntee (FF)	Noël Browne (CnaP)	3 seats 1948–1981
14th	1951	John A. Costello (FG)	Seán MacEntee (FF)	Noël Browne (Ind)	3 seats 1948–1981
15th	1954	John A. Costello (FG)	Seán MacEntee (FF)	John O'Donovan (FG)	3 seats 1948–1981
16th	1957	John A. Costello (FG)	Seán MacEntee (FF)	Noël Browne (Ind)	3 seats 1948–1981
17th	1961	John A. Costello (FG)	Seán MacEntee (FF)	Noël Browne (NPD)	3 seats 1948–1981
18th	1965	John A. Costello (FG)	Seán MacEntee (FF)	Seán Moore (FF)	3 seats 1948–1981
19th	1969	Garret FitzGerald (FG)	Noël Browne (Lab)	Seán Moore (FF)	3 seats 1948–1981
20th	1973	Garret FitzGerald (FG)	Fergus O'Brien (FG)	Seán Moore (FF)	3 seats 1948–1981
21st	1977	Garret FitzGerald (FG)	Ruairi Quinn (Lab)	Seán Moore (FF)	3 seats 1948–1981
22nd	1981	Garret FitzGerald (FG)	Gerard Brady (FF)	Seán Moore (FF)	Richie Ryan (FG)
23rd	1982 (Feb)	Garret FitzGerald (FG)	Gerard Brady (FF)	Ruairi Quinn (Lab)	Alexis FitzGerald Jnr (FG)
24th	1982 (Nov)	Garret FitzGerald (FG)	Gerard Brady (FF)	Ruairi Quinn (Lab)	Joe Doyle (FG)
25th	1987	Garret FitzGerald (FG)	Gerard Brady (FF)	Ruairi Quinn (Lab)	Michael McDowell (PDs)
26th	1989	Garret FitzGerald (FG)	Gerard Brady (FF)	Ruairi Quinn (Lab)	Joe Doyle (FG)
27th	1992	Frances Fitzgerald (FG)	Eoin Ryan Jnr (FF)	Ruairi Quinn (Lab)	Michael McDowell (PDs)
28th	1997	Frances Fitzgerald (FG)	Eoin Ryan Jnr (FF)	Ruairi Quinn (Lab)	John Gormley (GP)
29th	2002	Michael McDowell (PDs)	Eoin Ryan Jnr (FF)	Ruairi Quinn (Lab)	John Gormley (GP)
30th	2007	Lucinda Creighton (FG)	Chris Andrews (FF)	Ruairi Quinn (Lab)	John Gormley (GP)
31st	2011	Lucinda Creighton (FG)	Eoghan Murphy (FG)	Ruairi Quinn (Lab)	Kevin Humphreys (Lab)
32nd	2016	Constituency abolished. See Dublin Bay South.			
