= Alexis FitzGerald Snr =

Irish politician and solicitor (1916–1985)

Senator
- In office 5 November 1969 – 8 October 1981
- Constituency: Industrial and Commercial Panel

Personal details
- Born: 4 September 1916 Waterford, Ireland
- Died: 16 June 1985 (aged 68) Dublin, Ireland
- Party: Fine Gael
- Spouse: Grace Costello (m. 1946; died 1972) Barbara Sweetman (m. 1974)
- Children: 6
- Relatives: Alexis FitzGerald Jnr (nephew)
- Education: University College Dublin

Alexis James Oliver FitzGerald (4 September 1916 – 16 June 1985) was a Fine Gael politician, economist and solicitor. He was one of the founding partners of the Irish law firm McCann FitzGerald.

== Early life ==
He was born on 4 September 1916 in Waterford, the fourth child of Alexis FitzGerald and his wife, Elizabeth O'Halloran. He was educated at Clongowes Wood College, and studied legal and political science at University College Dublin. He later studied law, and in 1941 qualified as a solicitor.

He married Grace Costello in 1946, daughter of Ida Mary Costello and John A. Costello, Fine Gael leader and Taoiseach; and they had six children. Grace Costello died in 1972, and in 1974 FitzGerald married Barbara Sweetman.

== Politics ==
He was elected in 1969 to the 12th Seanad Éireann on the Industrial and Commercial Panel, and re-elected in 1973 and 1977. He retired from politics at the 1981 Seanad election, and his nephew Alexis FitzGerald Jnr was elected to the 15th Seanad, again by the Industrial and Commercial Panel.

He lectured in economics at University College Dublin, and from 1981 to 1982, he was a special adviser to Taoiseach Garret FitzGerald (no relation). Alexis FitzGerald died on 16 June 1985 and is buried in Glasnevin Cemetery.

== McCann FitzGerald ==
In 1947 FitzGerald was one of the founding partners of the Dublin solicitors' firm, McCann White & FitzGerald, now known as McCann FitzGerald, one of Ireland's largest law firms. He was the practice's senior partner until his death in 1985.

== Bibliography ==
- Lynch, Patrick and James Meenan (editors) (1987). Essays in Memory of Alexis FitzGerald, Dublin: The Incorporated Law Society of Ireland. ISBN 0-902027-29-8
