= 1991 Irish local elections =

Nationwide local authority elections

← 1985	27 June 1991	1999 →
- Turnout: 55.65% ▼3.33pp
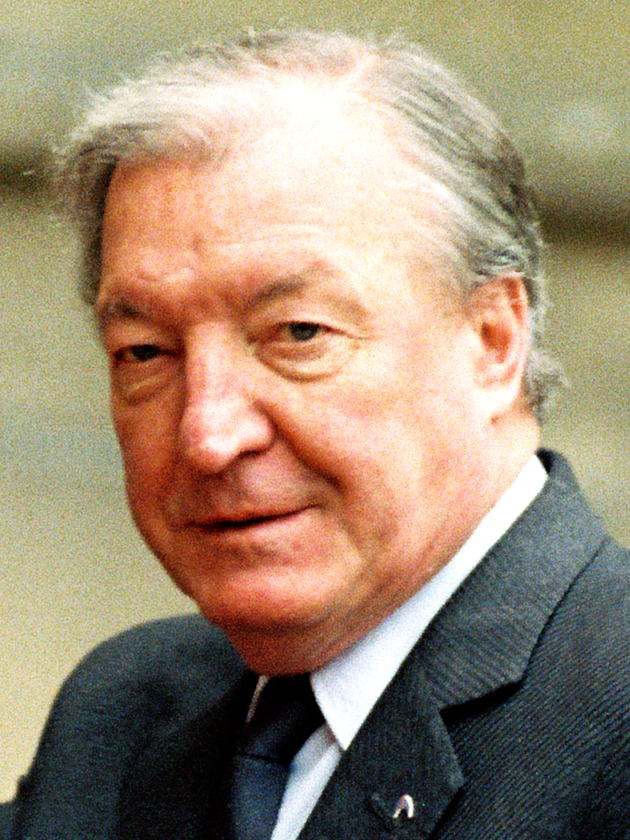

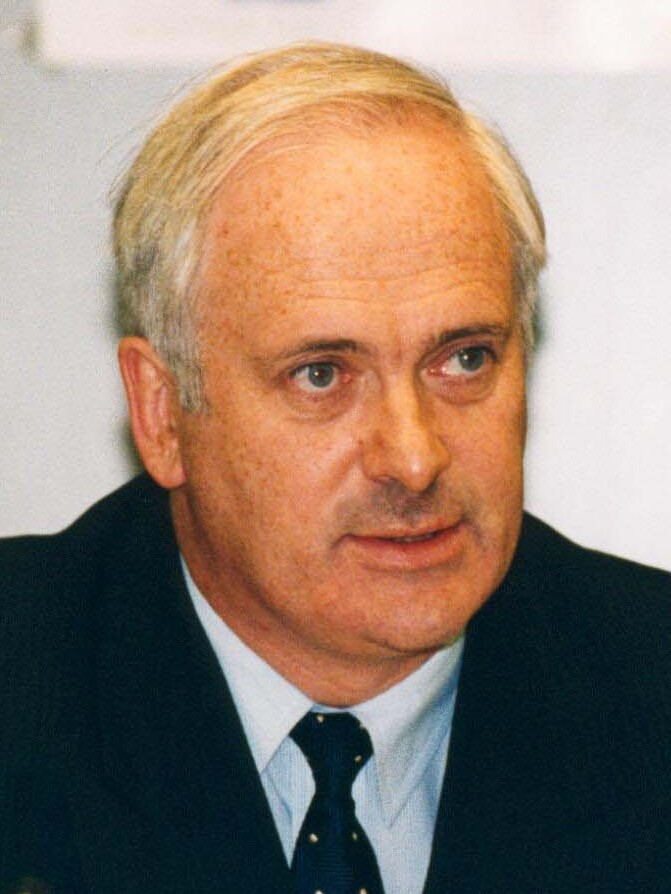

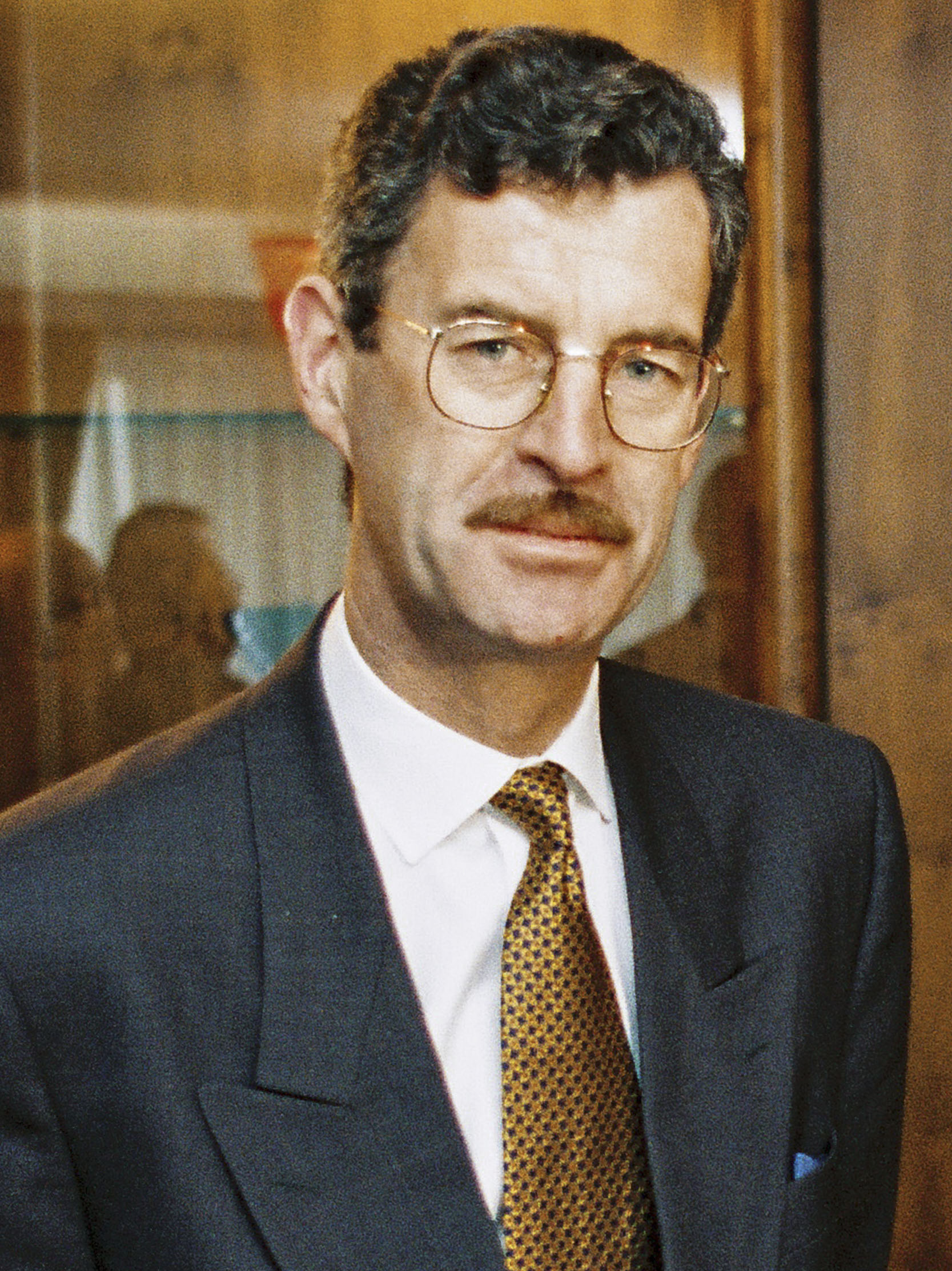

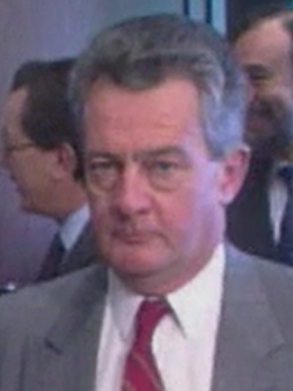

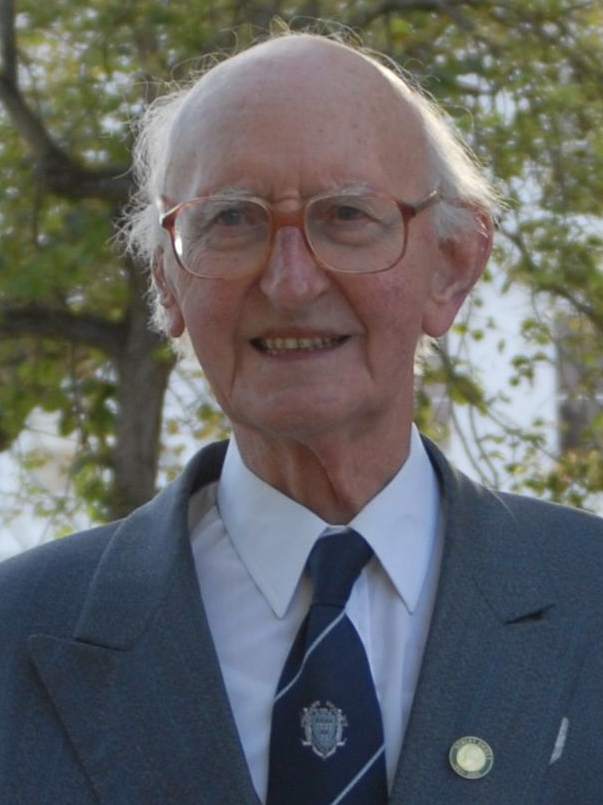

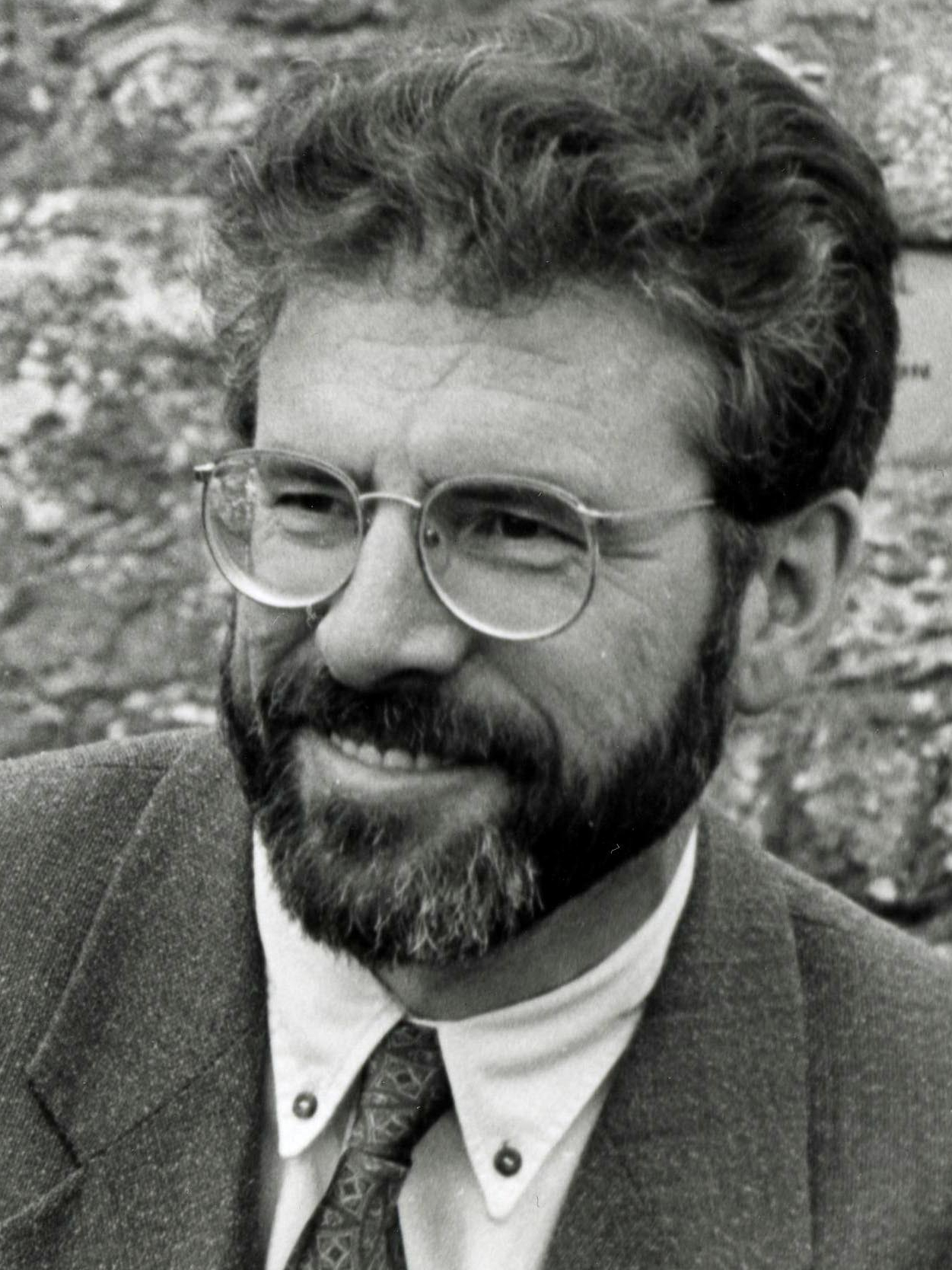

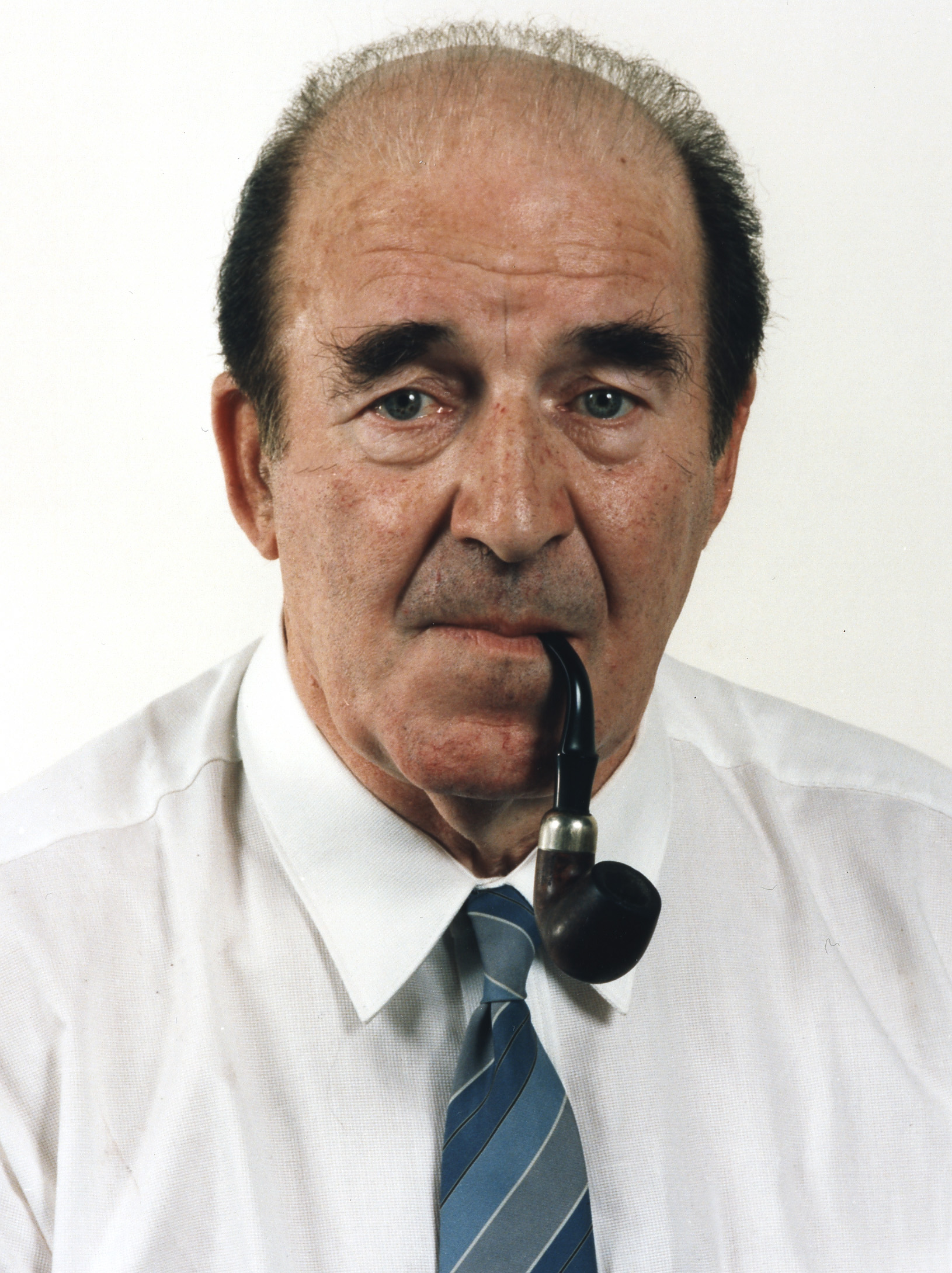
	First party	Second party	Third party
Leader	Charles Haughey	John Bruton	Dick Spring
Party	Fianna Fáil	Fine Gael	Labour
Leader since	7 December 1979	21 November 1990	1 November 1982
Seats won	358	272	92
Seat change	▼83	▼5	▲32
Popular vote	531,659	372,633	149,571
Percentage	37.8%	26.5%	10.6%
Swing	▼7.7%	▼3.3%	▲2.7%
	Fourth party	Fifth party	Sixth party
			Green
Leader	Desmond O'Malley	Tomás Mac Giolla	N/A
Party	Progressive Democrats	Workers' Party	Green
Leader since	21 December 1985	14 October 1962
Last election	N/A	N/A	N/A
Seats won	37	24	13
Seat change	▲37	▲4	▲13
Popular vote	70,926	50,996	32,951
Percentage	5.0%	3.6%	2.3%
Swing	▲5.0%	▲0.4%	▲1.8%
	Seventh party	Eighth party
Leader	Gerry Adams	Neil Blaney
Party	Sinn Féin	Independent Fianna Fáil
Leader since	13 November 1983	1972
Last election	N/A
Seats won	9	5
Seat change	▼1	▼1
Popular vote	29,903	12,162
Percentage	2.1%	0.9%
Swing	▼1.0%	▲0.1%

The 1991 Irish local elections were held in all administrative counties and county boroughs, the top tier of local government areas in Ireland, on Thursday, 27 June 1991.

The elections were postponed from June 1990. This allowed for the enactment of the Local Government Act 1991 prior to the vote. They were the first local elections contested by the Progressive Democrats, which had been founded in December 1985, and the first since Sinn Féin registered as a political party in December 1986.

There was a second tier of boroughs, urban districts and towns with boards of commissioners. Elections in non-county boroughs and towns were postponed until 1994.

== Results ==
=== Summary ===
Party	Seats	±	1st Pref. votes	FPv%	±%
Fianna Fáil	358	▼83	531,659	37.8	▼7.6
Fine Gael	272	▼15	372,633	26.5	▼3.3
Labour	92	▲32	149,571	10.6	▲2.7
Progressive Democrats	37	▲37	70,926	5.0	New
Workers' Party	24	▲4	50,996	3.6	▲0.4
Green	13	▲13	32,951	2.3	▲1.8
Sinn Féin	9	▼1	29,903	2.1	▼1.0
Independent Fianna Fáil (Note: Not a registered party.)	5	▼1	12,162	0.9	▲0.1
Republican Sinn Féin	1	▲1	2,517	0.2	New
Donegal Progressive Party	1	Steady	1,775	0.1	Steady
Independent Socialist	1	Steady	1,456	0.1	Steady
Christian Principles Party	0	Steady	1,351	0.1	New
Independent	78	▲14	150,418	10.7	▲2.0
Total	883	–	1,398,729	100.0	

=== By local authority ===
Authority	FF	FG	Lab	PD	WP	GP	SF	IFF	RSF	Ind	Total	Details
Carlow	9	7	4	1							21	Details
Cavan	11	9								5	25	Details
Clare	17	8	1	1						5	32	Details
Cork City	9	6	6	3	3	1				3	31	Details
Cork County	19	20	4	1	1					3	48	Details
Donegal	11	9	1		1		1	4		2	29	Details
Dublin City	20	6	10	1	5	4	1			5	52	Details
Dún Laoghaire–Rathdown	8	7	5	2	3	3					28	Details
Fingal	8	6	5	1		2				2	24	Details
Galway City	4	4	2	4						1	15	Details
Galway County	14	10		4						2	30	Details
Kerry	13	7	4							3	27	Details
Kildare	8	7	3	2	1	1	1			2	25	Details
Kilkenny	11	11	4								26	Details
Laois	13	9	1	1						1	25	Details
Leitrim	9	9					1	1		2	22	Details
Limerick City	2	4	5	3	1					2	17	Details
Limerick County	13	10	1	4							28	Details
Longford	9	8							1	3	21	Details
Louth	12	6	2	2			1			3	26	Details
Mayo	15	13	1							2	31	Details
Meath	12	9	4		1					3	29	Details
Monaghan	8	7					2			3	20	Details
Offaly	10	6	1	1						3	21	Details
Roscommon	11	10								5	26	Details
Sligo	11	11								3	25	Details
South Dublin	7	6	4	4	3	1				1	26	Details
Tipperary North	11	7	2							1	21	Details
Tipperary South	10	9	4							3	26	Details
Waterford City	3	2	3	2	3					2	15	Details
Waterford County	10	9	3		1						23	Details
Westmeath	12	6	4							1	23	Details
Wexford	8	8	1							4	21	Details
Wicklow	9	4	5		1	1				4	24	Details

== See also ==
- Local government in the Republic of Ireland
- Category:Irish local government councils
