= Colm Gallagher =

Irish politician (died 1957)

Teachta Dála
- In office March 1957 – 26 June 1957
- In office May 1951 – May 1954
- Constituency: Dublin North-Central

Personal details
- Born: Derry, Ireland
- Died: 26 June 1957 Dublin, Ireland
- Party: Fianna Fáil
- Spouse: Peggy Gallagher
- Children: 4

Colm Gallagher (died 26 June 1957) was an Irish Fianna Fáil politician who was elected twice as Teachta Dála (TD) for Dublin North-Central, in 1951 and in 1957.

His first candidacy was at the 1948 general election, where he was unsuccessful, winning just 3.3% of the first-preference votes and losing his deposit. At the 1951 general election, he tripled his share of the vote and won a second seat for Fianna Fáil in the three-seat constituency.

He lost his seat at the 1954 general election to the Labour Party's Maureen O'Carroll, but defeated her at the 1957 general election.

His death in June 1957, just three months after the general election, triggered a by-election on 14 November, which was won by an independent candidate, Frank Sherwin.

Prior to his involvement in politics, Colm Gallagher was active in the promotion and administration of amateur boxing and served as a referee at European level, including the 1948 and 1952 Summer Olympics (in London and Helsinki respectively). He lived in Glasnevin and was married to Peggy Gallagher; they had three sons and one daughter.

Dáil	Election	Deputy (Party)	Deputy (Party)	Deputy (Party)	Deputy (Party)
13th	1948	Vivion de Valera (FF)	Martin O'Sullivan (Lab)	Patrick McGilligan (FG)	3 seats 1948–1961
14th	1951	Vivion de Valera (FF)	Colm Gallagher (FF)	Patrick McGilligan (FG)	3 seats 1948–1961
15th	1954	Vivion de Valera (FF)	Maureen O'Carroll (Lab)	Patrick McGilligan (FG)	3 seats 1948–1961
16th	1957	Vivion de Valera (FF)	Colm Gallagher (FF)	Patrick McGilligan (FG)	3 seats 1948–1961
16th	1957 by-election	Vivion de Valera (FF)	Frank Sherwin (Ind.)	Patrick McGilligan (FG)	3 seats 1948–1961
17th	1961	Vivion de Valera (FF)	Frank Sherwin (Ind.)	Patrick McGilligan (FG)	Celia Lynch (FF)
18th	1965	Vivion de Valera (FF)	Michael O'Leary (Lab)	Luke Belton (FG)	Celia Lynch (FF)
19th	1969	George Colley (FF)	Michael O'Leary (Lab)	Luke Belton (FG)	Celia Lynch (FF)
20th	1973	George Colley (FF)	Michael O'Leary (Lab)	Luke Belton (FG)	Celia Lynch (FF)
21st	1977	Vincent Brady (FF)	Michael O'Leary (Lab)	Michael Keating (FG)	3 seats 1977–1981
22nd	1981	Vincent Brady (FF)	Charles Haughey (FF)	Noël Browne (SLP)	George Birmingham (FG)
23rd	1982 (Feb)	Vincent Brady (FF)	Charles Haughey (FF)	Richard Bruton (FG)	George Birmingham (FG)
24th	1982 (Nov)	Vincent Brady (FF)	Charles Haughey (FF)	Richard Bruton (FG)	George Birmingham (FG)
25th	1987	Vincent Brady (FF)	Charles Haughey (FF)	Richard Bruton (FG)	George Birmingham (FG)
26th	1989	Vincent Brady (FF)	Charles Haughey (FF)	Richard Bruton (FG)	Ivor Callely (FF)
27th	1992	Seán Haughey (FF)	Derek McDowell (Lab)	Richard Bruton (FG)	Ivor Callely (FF)
28th	1997	Seán Haughey (FF)	Derek McDowell (Lab)	Richard Bruton (FG)	Ivor Callely (FF)
29th	2002	Seán Haughey (FF)	Finian McGrath (Ind.)	Richard Bruton (FG)	Ivor Callely (FF)
30th	2007	Seán Haughey (FF)	Finian McGrath (Ind.)	Richard Bruton (FG)	3 seats from 2007
31st	2011	Aodhán Ó Ríordáin (Lab)	Finian McGrath (Ind.)	Richard Bruton (FG)	3 seats from 2007
32nd	2016	Constituency abolished. See Dublin Bay North			
