= 1985 Waterford County Council election =

Part of the 1985 Irish local elections

- 20 June 1985

All 23 seats on Waterford County Council
	First party	Second party	Third party
Party	Fianna Fáil	Fine Gael	Labour
Seats won	11	10	2
Seat change	0	-1	+1
- Map showing the area of Waterford County Council
Council control after election
TBD

An election to Waterford County Council took place on 20 June 1985 as part of the Irish local elections. 23 councillors were elected from four local electoral areas (LEAs) for a five-year term of office on the electoral system of proportional representation by means of the single transferable vote (PR-STV). This term was extended for a further year, to 1991.

== Results by party ==
Party	Seats	±	First Pref. votes	FPv%	±%
Fianna Fáil	11	0	11,255	48.74	
Fine Gael	10	-1	8,790	38.06	
Labour	2	+1	1,776	7.69	
Totals	23	0	23,093	100.00	—

== Results by local electoral area ==
=== Dungarvan ===
Dungarvan: 7 seats
Party	Candidate	FPv%	Count													
Party	Candidate	FPv%	1	2	3	4	5	6	7	8	9	10	11	12	13	14
Fianna Fáil	Jackie Fahey TD*		911	931												
Labour	Billy Kyne*		818	843	880	919	1,016									
Fianna Fáil	Patrick Kenneally*		739	745	754	778	783	785	832	834	973					
Fine Gael	Garry O'Halloran*		604	612	614	626	629	633	731	731	819	892	898	1,042		
Fine Gael	James Harty*		598	603	655	683	686	686	752	752	797	865	868	1,053		
Fianna Fáil	Sean Whelan		489	497	500	528	542	547	580	581	648	667	691	753	772	788
Fine Gael	Simon Hanley		472	479	483	483	493	500	549	550	553	610	610			
Fine Gael	Michael O'Riordan		466	474	480	482	503	522	535	535	538	649	649	747	832	903
Fianna Fáil	Declan Goode*		411	418	438	455	482	505	514	515	560	605	619	672	685	692
Fianna Fáil	John O'Brien		396	404	406	422	422	422	428	428						
Fine Gael	Jeremiah O'Brien*		367	370	372	374	376	376								
Fine Gael	Richard Walsh		343	352	357	360	385	400	430	430	434					
Labour	Tommy Wade		230	237	249	263										
Sinn Féin	Seamus O Cuilliu		216	220	241											
Workers' Party	Tomas O Ceilleachair		185	197												
Independent	Ned Bluett		116													
Independent	James Coll		46													
Electorate: 10,309 Valid: 7,407 (72.68%) Spoilt: 86 Quota: 926 Turnout: 7,493

=== Kilmacthomas ===
Kilmacthomas: 5 seats
Party	Candidate	FPv%	Count						
Party	Candidate	FPv%	1	2	3	4	5	6	7
Fianna Fáil	Tom Cunningham*		939						
Fianna Fáil	Kieran O'Ryan*		933						
Fine Gael	Oliver Coffey*		882						
Fianna Fáil	Sean Fahey		670	720	794	801	913		
Fine Gael	Patrick Coffey*		589	605	618	677	701	715	767
Fianna Fáil	Michael Hennebry*		443	472	492	494	525	570	674
Sinn Féin	Jackie Whelan		215	221	227	229	238	242	
Fianna Fáil	Noel Fleming		168	199	212	217			
Electorate: 8,054 Valid: 4,839 (60.88%) Spoilt: 61 Quota: 807 Turnout: 4,903

=== Lismore ===
Lismore: 4 seats
Party	Candidate	FPv%	Count			
Party	Candidate	FPv%	1	2	3	4
Fine Gael	Willie McDonnell*		1,074			
Fianna Fáil	James Quirke*		953			
Fine Gael	James Walsh*		758	871		
Fianna Fáil	Ollie Wilkinson		728	751	781	834
Fianna Fáil	James Tobin		612	659	715	795
Labour	Brendan Herlihy		99			
Labour	James Kennedy		92			
Electorate: 5,907 Valid: 4,316 (73.84%) Spoilt: 46 Quota: 864 Turnout: 4,362

=== Tramore ===
Tramore: 7 seats
Party	Candidate	FPv%	Count									
Party	Candidate	FPv%	1	2	3	4	5	6	7	8	9	10
Fianna Fáil	Paddy Cahill*		878									
Fine Gael	Michael Queally*		784	788	806	810	846					
Fine Gael	John Carey*		769	781	826							
Fianna Fáil	Brian Swift		657	662	667	678	770	795	862			
Fine Gael	Con Casey		544	546	583	586	606	743	880			
Labour	Brian O'Shea		537	554	559	562	579	605	719	723	769	783
Fianna Fáil	Seamus Dunphy*		509	517	522	541	645	654	706	709	724	748
Fianna Fáil	Geoff Power*		490	492	496	502	549	667	678	683	685	692
Independent	Maureen O'Carroll		418	427	435	437	445	455				
Fine Gael	Noel McDonagh		371	374	403	404	406					
Fianna Fáil	Peter Griffin		329	335	339	351						
Fine Gael	Bernie Flanagan		169	171								
Workers' Party	Paddy Gallagher		76									
Electorate: 11,583 Valid: 6,531 (56.38%) Quota: 817
