= Patrick Little =

Irish politician (1884–1963)

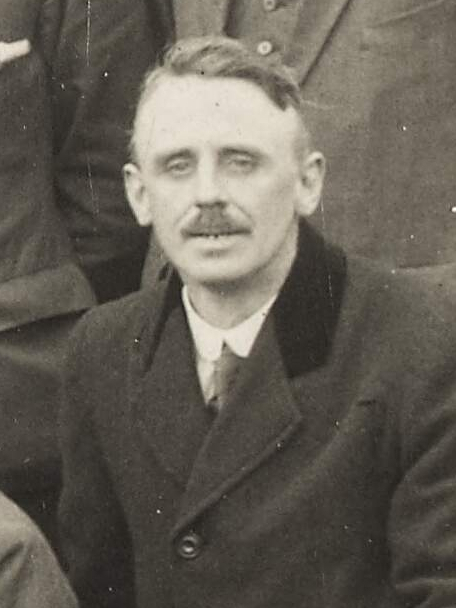
- Little in 1927

Minister for Posts and Telegraphs
- In office 8 September 1939 – 18 February 1948
- Taoiseach: Éamon de Valera
- Preceded by: Thomas Derrig
- Succeeded by: James Everett

Parliamentary Secretary
- 1933–1939: Government Chief Whip
- 1933–1939: External Affairs

Teachta Dála
- In office June 1927 – May 1954
- Constituency: Waterford

Personal details
- Born: 17 June 1884 Dundrum, County Dublin, Ireland
- Died: 16 May 1963 (aged 78) Dublin, Ireland
- Party: Fianna Fáil
- Spouse: Seonaid Ní Leoid (m. 1917)
- Parent: Philip Francis Little (father)
- Relatives: Ciarán Cuffe (grand-nephew)
- Education: University College Dublin
- Occupation: Solicitor, journalist

Patrick John Little (17 June 1884 – 16 May 1963) was an Irish Fianna Fáil politician. A founder-member of the party, he served in a number of cabinet positions, most notably as the country's longest-serving Minister for Posts and Telegraphs.

== Early life ==
Born in Dundrum, County Dublin, Little was the son of Philip Francis Little and Mary Jane Holdright. Both his parents were Canadian natives, while his father had served as the first Premier of Newfoundland before settling in Ireland. Here he became involved in the Irish Home Rule Movement.

Little was educated at Clongowes Wood College, before later attending University College Dublin. Here he studied law and qualified as a solicitor in 1914.

== Revolutionary years ==
Little was engaged in the independence struggle from an early stage. Following the Easter Rising in 1916, he formed, together with Stephen O'Mara, the Irish Nation League, who while being opposed to the Irish Parliamentary Party and supportive of abstentionism, were wary of the militarism of the Irish Volunteers. In 1918 the Volunteers, the Irish Nation League, and the Liberty Clubs, followers of George Noble Plunkett, agreed to merge under the Sinn Féin banner with Éamon de Valera as President to fight the 1918 general election on an abstentionist platform.

Little contested the constituency of Dublin Rathmines but lost to Unionist Maurice Dockrell, the only Unionist elected in the area that would become Irish Free State outside of Dublin University. He remained in the background of Sinn Féin for the next number of years. In 1921 he was sent to South Africa to represent the government of the Irish Republic. He opposed the Anglo-Irish Treaty and fought with the Four Courts Garrison during the Civil War.

He became the first editor of An Phoblacht in 1925. He also edited other republican newspapers including New Ireland, Éire and Sinn Féin.

== Political career ==
Little joined Fianna Fáil shortly after its foundation in 1926. He was first elected to Dáil Éireann as a TD for the Waterford constituency at the June 1927 general election. He represented the constituency until 1954.

Little was appointed Government Chief Whip and Parliamentary Secretary to the Minister for External Affairs in 1933. Little was appointed Minister for Posts and Telegraphs in 1939 and remained in this office until 1948, when Fianna Fáil failed to form a government. He was not reappointed to the cabinet when Fianna Fáil returned to office in 1951. In 1952, following the death of Bridget Redmond, Fianna Fáil won the resulting by-election and held three out of four seats in the constituency. This would have been unsustainable at the next general election so Little did not contest the 1954 general election.

== Retirement ==
He was the first chairman of the Arts Council from 1951 until 1956. He was responsible for the development of the Radio Éireann Symphony Orchestra. In 1957 he was appointed to the Council of State by Seán T. O'Kelly. He was re-appointed to the Council by Éamon de Valera in 1959.

Little died in May 1963. He is a grand-uncle of Green Party MEP Ciarán Cuffe.

== See also ==
- Families in the Oireachtas

Political offices
| Preceded by Gerald Boland | Government Chief Whip; 1933–1939 | Succeeded by Paddy Smith |
| Vacant | Parliamentary Secretary to the Minister for External Affairs; 1933–1939 | Succeeded by Paddy Smith |
| Preceded by Thomas Derrig | Minister for Posts and Telegraphs; 1939–1948 | Succeeded by James Everett |

| Dáil | Election | Deputy (Party) | Deputy (Party) | Deputy (Party) | Deputy (Party) |
|---|---|---|---|---|---|
| 4th | 1923 | Caitlín Brugha (Rep) | John Butler (Lab) | Nicholas Wall (FP) | William Redmond (NL) |
| 5th | 1927 (Jun) | Caitlín Brugha (Rep) | Patrick Little (FF) | Vincent White (CnaG) | William Redmond (NL) |
| 6th | 1927 (Sep) | Seán Goulding (FF) | Patrick Little (FF) | Vincent White (CnaG) | William Redmond (NL) |
| 7th | 1932 | Seán Goulding (FF) | Patrick Little (FF) | John Kiersey (CnaG) | William Redmond (CnaG) |
| 8th | 1933 | Seán Goulding (FF) | Patrick Little (FF) | Nicholas Wall (NCP) | Bridget Redmond (CnaG) |
| 9th | 1937 | Michael Morrissey (FF) | Patrick Little (FF) | Nicholas Wall (FG) | Bridget Redmond (FG) |
| 10th | 1938 | Michael Morrissey (FF) | Patrick Little (FF) | William Broderick (FG) | Bridget Redmond (FG) |
| 11th | 1943 | Michael Morrissey (FF) | Patrick Little (FF) | Denis Heskin (CnaT) | Bridget Redmond (FG) |
| 12th | 1944 | Michael Morrissey (FF) | Patrick Little (FF) | Denis Heskin (CnaT) | Bridget Redmond (FG) |
| 12th | 1947 by-election | John Ormonde (FF) | Patrick Little (FF) | Denis Heskin (CnaT) | Bridget Redmond (FG) |
| 13th | 1948 | John Ormonde (FF) | Patrick Little (FF) | Thomas Kyne (Lab) | Bridget Redmond (FG) |
| 14th | 1951 | John Ormonde (FF) | Patrick Little (FF) | Thomas Kyne (Lab) | Bridget Redmond (FG) |
| 14th | 1952 by-election | John Ormonde (FF) | Patrick Little (FF) | Thomas Kyne (Lab) | William Kenneally (FF) |
| 15th | 1954 | John Ormonde (FF) | Thaddeus Lynch (FG) | Thomas Kyne (Lab) | William Kenneally (FF) |
| 16th | 1957 | John Ormonde (FF) | Thaddeus Lynch (FG) | Thomas Kyne (Lab) | William Kenneally (FF) |
| 17th | 1961 | John Ormonde (FF) | Thaddeus Lynch (FG) | Thomas Kyne (Lab) | 3 seats 1961–1977 |
| 18th | 1965 | Billy Kenneally (FF) | Thaddeus Lynch (FG) | Thomas Kyne (Lab) | 3 seats 1961–1977 |
| 18th | 1966 by-election | Billy Kenneally (FF) | Fad Browne (FF) | Thomas Kyne (Lab) | 3 seats 1961–1977 |
| 19th | 1969 | Billy Kenneally (FF) | Fad Browne (FF) | Edward Collins (FG) | 3 seats 1961–1977 |
| 20th | 1973 | Billy Kenneally (FF) | Thomas Kyne (Lab) | Edward Collins (FG) | 3 seats 1961–1977 |
| 21st | 1977 | Billy Kenneally (FF) | Jackie Fahey (FF) | Edward Collins (FG) | Austin Deasy (FG) |
| 22nd | 1981 | Billy Kenneally (FF) | Jackie Fahey (FF) | Edward Collins (FG) | Austin Deasy (FG) |
| 23rd | 1982 (Feb) | Paddy Gallagher (SF–WP) | Jackie Fahey (FF) | Edward Collins (FG) | Austin Deasy (FG) |
| 24th | 1982 (Nov) | Donal Ormonde (FF) | Jackie Fahey (FF) | Edward Collins (FG) | Austin Deasy (FG) |
| 25th | 1987 | Martin Cullen (PDs) | Jackie Fahey (FF) | Brian Swift (FF) | Austin Deasy (FG) |
| 26th | 1989 | Brian O'Shea (Lab) | Jackie Fahey (FF) | Brendan Kenneally (FF) | Austin Deasy (FG) |
| 27th | 1992 | Brian O'Shea (Lab) | Martin Cullen (PDs) | Brendan Kenneally (FF) | Austin Deasy (FG) |
| 28th | 1997 | Brian O'Shea (Lab) | Martin Cullen (FF) | Brendan Kenneally (FF) | Austin Deasy (FG) |
| 29th | 2002 | Brian O'Shea (Lab) | Martin Cullen (FF) | Ollie Wilkinson (FF) | John Deasy (FG) |
| 30th | 2007 | Brian O'Shea (Lab) | Martin Cullen (FF) | Brendan Kenneally (FF) | John Deasy (FG) |
| 31st | 2011 | Ciara Conway (Lab) | John Halligan (Ind.) | Paudie Coffey (FG) | John Deasy (FG) |
| 32nd | 2016 | David Cullinane (SF) | John Halligan (Ind.) | Mary Butler (FF) | John Deasy (FG) |
| 33rd | 2020 | David Cullinane (SF) | Marc Ó Cathasaigh (GP) | Mary Butler (FF) | Matt Shanahan (Ind.) |
| 34th | 2024 | David Cullinane (SF) | Conor D. McGuinness (SF) | Mary Butler (FF) | John Cummins (FG) |
