= Nicholas Wall =

Nicholas Wall may refer to:

- Nicholas Wall (judge) (1945–2017), English judge, President of the Family Division
- Nicholas Wall (politician) (1884–1939), Irish politician
- Nick Wall (1906–1983), Canadian jockey
- Nick Wall (squash player) (born 2000), English squash player
