= Oliver Wilkinson =

Oliver Wilkinson may refer to:

- Ollie Wilkinson (politician) (born 1944), Irish former politician
- Ollie Wilkinson (racing driver) (born 1996), British racing driver
