= John Deasy (Fine Gael politician) =

Irish former politician (born 1967)

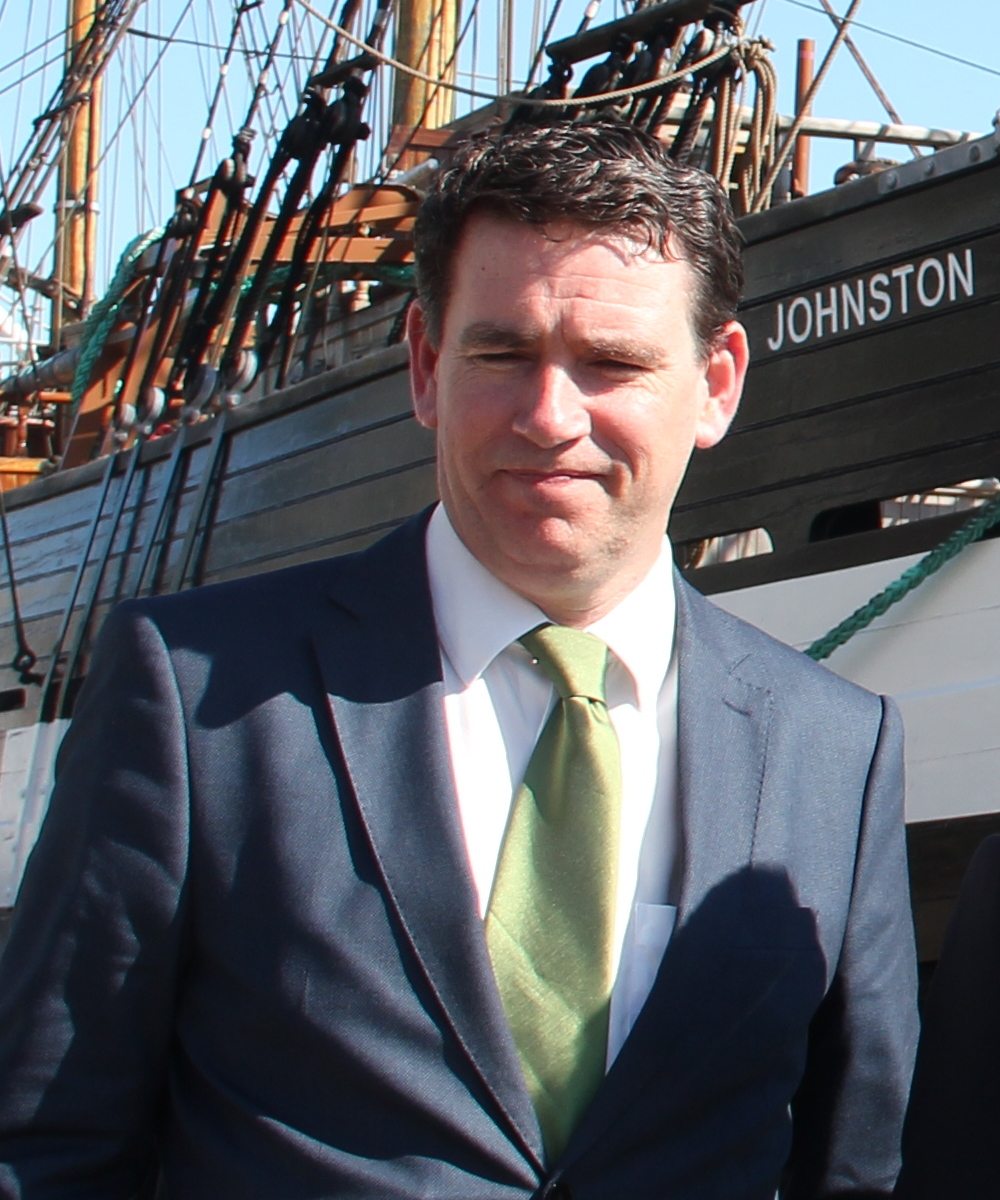
- Deasy in 2015

Teachta Dála
- In office May 2002 – February 2020
- Constituency: Waterford

Personal details
- Born: 8 October 1967 (age 58) Dungarvan, County Waterford, Ireland
- Party: Fine Gael
- Spouse: Maura Derrane (m. 2007)
- Children: 1
- Parent: Austin Deasy (father)
- Education: Mercyhurst College; University College Cork

John Deasy (born 8 October 1967) is an Irish former Fine Gael politician who served as a Teachta Dála (TD) for the Waterford constituency from 2002 to 2020.

== Early and personal life ==
Deasy was brought up in Stradbally and Dungarvan, County Waterford. He was educated at Coláiste na Rinne, An Rinn, County Waterford, and at St. Augustine's College in Dungarvan. Deasy studied at Mercyhurst College, Erie, Pennsylvania, on a golfing scholarship where he received a Bachelor of Arts in History and Communications.

In 1990, Deasy was employed as a legislative assistant in the United States Senate, handling trade and foreign affairs, for Republican Senator John Heinz. He remained in the position until Heinz's death in 1991. The following year he became manager of public affairs for a multinational waste company. Deasy was also legislative assistant in the United States House of Representatives, handling trade, foreign affairs, energy, environment, banking, economic development, immigration and human rights, for Congressman Ronald Machtley.

He returned to Ireland in 1997, and studied at University College Cork, qualifying with a degree in law. In May 2005, Deasy married the RTÉ presenter, Maura Derrane. The couple have a son, Cal, born in 2014.

== Political career ==
In 1999, he embarked on a political career and was elected to Waterford County Council and Dungarvan Town Council. At the 2002 general election, he was elected to Dáil Éireann for the first time, succeeding his father, former Minister for Agriculture Austin Deasy, who was retiring. He was appointed Spokesperson for Justice, Equality and Law Reform, by the new leader, Enda Kenny. He was sacked from the Fine Gael front bench in 2004, for smoking tobacco in the members bar at Leinster House, the seat of the Irish Parliament, just days after a nationwide ban on smoking in the workplace had come into effect. In October 2004, he failed to return to the front bench in the reshuffle, but was appointed Chairman of the Dáil European Union Affairs Committee.

In January 2007, he announced his intention to challenge Enda Kenny's leadership of Fine Gael should the party fail to enter government after the 2007 election. Fine Gael did not enter government, nor did Deasy carry out his challenge. He served as party Deputy Spokesperson on Foreign Affairs, with special responsibility for Overseas Development Aid from 2007 to 2010. Having topped the poll in Waterford at the 2011 election, he was vice-chair of the Dáil Committee of Public Accounts.

Deasy was re-elected at the 2016 election. In July 2017, he was appointed government envoy to the United States Congress advocating for Irish undocumented immigrants. In November 2017, he announced that he would not be standing at the next general election due to health concerns. In June 2019, the Fine Gael organisation in Waterford constituency passed a motion of no confidence in Deasy, supporting his longtime rival Paudie Coffey.

== See also ==
- Families in the Oireachtas

Dáil	Election	Deputy (Party)	Deputy (Party)	Deputy (Party)	Deputy (Party)
4th	1923	Caitlín Brugha (Rep)	John Butler (Lab)	Nicholas Wall (FP)	William Redmond (NL)
5th	1927 (Jun)	Caitlín Brugha (Rep)	Patrick Little (FF)	Vincent White (CnaG)	William Redmond (NL)
6th	1927 (Sep)	Seán Goulding (FF)	Patrick Little (FF)	Vincent White (CnaG)	William Redmond (NL)
7th	1932	Seán Goulding (FF)	Patrick Little (FF)	John Kiersey (CnaG)	William Redmond (CnaG)
8th	1933	Seán Goulding (FF)	Patrick Little (FF)	Nicholas Wall (NCP)	Bridget Redmond (CnaG)
9th	1937	Michael Morrissey (FF)	Patrick Little (FF)	Nicholas Wall (FG)	Bridget Redmond (FG)
10th	1938	Michael Morrissey (FF)	Patrick Little (FF)	William Broderick (FG)	Bridget Redmond (FG)
11th	1943	Michael Morrissey (FF)	Patrick Little (FF)	Denis Heskin (CnaT)	Bridget Redmond (FG)
12th	1944	Michael Morrissey (FF)	Patrick Little (FF)	Denis Heskin (CnaT)	Bridget Redmond (FG)
12th	1947 by-election	John Ormonde (FF)	Patrick Little (FF)	Denis Heskin (CnaT)	Bridget Redmond (FG)
13th	1948	John Ormonde (FF)	Patrick Little (FF)	Thomas Kyne (Lab)	Bridget Redmond (FG)
14th	1951	John Ormonde (FF)	Patrick Little (FF)	Thomas Kyne (Lab)	Bridget Redmond (FG)
14th	1952 by-election	John Ormonde (FF)	Patrick Little (FF)	Thomas Kyne (Lab)	William Kenneally (FF)
15th	1954	John Ormonde (FF)	Thaddeus Lynch (FG)	Thomas Kyne (Lab)	William Kenneally (FF)
16th	1957	John Ormonde (FF)	Thaddeus Lynch (FG)	Thomas Kyne (Lab)	William Kenneally (FF)
17th	1961	John Ormonde (FF)	Thaddeus Lynch (FG)	Thomas Kyne (Lab)	3 seats 1961–1977
18th	1965	Billy Kenneally (FF)	Thaddeus Lynch (FG)	Thomas Kyne (Lab)	3 seats 1961–1977
18th	1966 by-election	Billy Kenneally (FF)	Fad Browne (FF)	Thomas Kyne (Lab)	3 seats 1961–1977
19th	1969	Billy Kenneally (FF)	Fad Browne (FF)	Edward Collins (FG)	3 seats 1961–1977
20th	1973	Billy Kenneally (FF)	Thomas Kyne (Lab)	Edward Collins (FG)	3 seats 1961–1977
21st	1977	Billy Kenneally (FF)	Jackie Fahey (FF)	Edward Collins (FG)	Austin Deasy (FG)
22nd	1981	Billy Kenneally (FF)	Jackie Fahey (FF)	Edward Collins (FG)	Austin Deasy (FG)
23rd	1982 (Feb)	Paddy Gallagher (SF–WP)	Jackie Fahey (FF)	Edward Collins (FG)	Austin Deasy (FG)
24th	1982 (Nov)	Donal Ormonde (FF)	Jackie Fahey (FF)	Edward Collins (FG)	Austin Deasy (FG)
25th	1987	Martin Cullen (PDs)	Jackie Fahey (FF)	Brian Swift (FF)	Austin Deasy (FG)
26th	1989	Brian O'Shea (Lab)	Jackie Fahey (FF)	Brendan Kenneally (FF)	Austin Deasy (FG)
27th	1992	Brian O'Shea (Lab)	Martin Cullen (PDs)	Brendan Kenneally (FF)	Austin Deasy (FG)
28th	1997	Brian O'Shea (Lab)	Martin Cullen (FF)	Brendan Kenneally (FF)	Austin Deasy (FG)
29th	2002	Brian O'Shea (Lab)	Martin Cullen (FF)	Ollie Wilkinson (FF)	John Deasy (FG)
30th	2007	Brian O'Shea (Lab)	Martin Cullen (FF)	Brendan Kenneally (FF)	John Deasy (FG)
31st	2011	Ciara Conway (Lab)	John Halligan (Ind.)	Paudie Coffey (FG)	John Deasy (FG)
32nd	2016	David Cullinane (SF)	John Halligan (Ind.)	Mary Butler (FF)	John Deasy (FG)
33rd	2020	David Cullinane (SF)	Marc Ó Cathasaigh (GP)	Mary Butler (FF)	Matt Shanahan (Ind.)
34th	2024	David Cullinane (SF)	Conor D. McGuinness (SF)	Mary Butler (FF)	John Cummins (FG)
