= Katharine Bulbulia =

Irish politician (born 1943)

Senator
- In office 8 October 1981 – 1 November 1989
- Constituency: Administrative Panel

Personal details
- Born: Katharine O'Carroll; 1943 (age 82–83) County Waterford, Ireland
- Party: Fine Gael; Progressive Democrats
- Spouse: Abdul Bulbulia
- Children: 3
- Education: Dublin Institute of Technology; University College Dublin

Katharine Bulbulia (née O'Carroll; born 1943) is a former politician from County Waterford in Ireland. She was a Fine Gael senator from 1981 to 1989, and subsequently joined the Progressive Democrats (PDs), serving from 1997 to 2006 as a senior aide to the party's leader.

She is a former director of the Crisis Pregnancy Agency, a government-sponsored body planning and co-ordinating body established to formulate and implement a strategy to address the issue of crisis pregnancy in Ireland. She was also a member of the AWEPA Governing Council.

== Early life and family ==
Katharine O'Carroll was born in Dublin, but relocated to Waterford at a young age where she was educated at the Sacred Heart of Mary convent, before taking a diploma in household management at St. Mary's College in Cathal Brugha Street, Dublin (now the College of Catering of the Dublin Institute of Technology). She subsequently graduated from University College Dublin with a Bachelor of Arts degree and a Higher Diploma in Education, before working as a teacher.

She is married to Abdul Bulbulia, a general practitioner in Waterford. They have one daughter and two sons.

== Political career ==
A founder member of the Waterford branch of the Women's Political Association, Bulbulia joined Fine Gael in the late 1970s, when the party's leader Garret FitzGerald was encouraging more women to join. She stood as a Fine Gael candidate for Tramore in the 1979 local elections, where she topped the poll and became the first woman ever elected to Waterford County Council. She was later elected as well to Waterford City Council, and served from 1979 as a member of the South-Eastern Health Board. On the Health Board, she fought to overturn the blocking by local officials of the distribution of a book called The Book of the Child, published by Ireland's Health Education Bureau, because it included a page about contraception.

Bulbulia then stood unsuccessfully as a Fine Gael candidate for the Waterford constituency at three general elections: 1981, November 1982, and 1989. After her 1981 defeat, she was elected to the 15th Seanad on the Administrative Panel, and re-elected three times until her defeat at the 1989 election to the 19th Seanad.

Martin Cullen the Progressive Democrats TD for Waterford, defected to Fianna Fáil after the a dispute over candidate selection for the 1994 European Parliament election, and Bulbulia then joined the PDs. She stood as the PD candidate in Waterford at the 1997 general election, but again failed to win a seat. However, the Rainbow coalition government was defeated in the election, and a new coalition government was formed between Fianna Fáil and the Progressive Democrats. Bulbulia was appointed as programme manager to the Tánaiste, PD leader Mary Harney, a post she held for nine years until Harney was replaced as leader in September 2006 by Michael McDowell. The job, which carried at the end a salary of €140,000 a year, involved daily liaison with the Taoiseach's programme manager, Gerry Hickey. That working relationship formed the main channel of communication between the two parties in the coalition. Bulbulia also played an important role in communicating with other members of the PD parliamentary party about the decisions taken at Government level.

Harney stayed on as Minister for Health after resigning the party leadership, and in November 2006 she appointed Bulbulia as chair of the Crisis Pregnancy Agency. The previous week, her husband Abdul had been appointed to a new Government technical advisory group on HIV/AIDS and other global communicable diseases. He had previously been appointed by Brian Cowen (Harney's predecessor as Minister for Health) as a member of the Medical Council of Ireland, where he initiated moves which led in 2001 to a softening of the council's guidelines on abortion.

Her appointment was criticised by the anti-abortion Family and Life group, who condemned Bulbulia for having opposed the 1983 Anti-abortion amendment to the Constitution of Ireland. The following year the agency came into conflict with the Catholic pregnancy counselling agency CURA, when it refused to renew CURA's €654,000 contract to provide advice to pregnant women. In 2005, CURA had stopped distributing the Agency's Positive Options leaflet after Bishops objected to its inclusion of information on abortion, in breach of its contract with the Crisis Pregnancy Agency, and in May 2007 Bulbulia said that it was up to CURA to look at the agency's terms and conditions to see if they could abide by them. The contract was not renewed, and in October 2007 the Irish episcopal conference instructed its chief negotiator, Bishop John Fleming, not to sign a new contract with the Crisis Pregnancy Agency unless the church's "absolute" opposition to abortion was respected.
