= Waterford (Dáil constituency) =

Dáil constituency (1923–present)

- Dáil constituency
- Location of Waterford within Ireland
- Interactive map of constituency boundaries since the 2024 general election
- Major settlements: Dungarvan; Tramore; Waterford

Current constituency
- Created: 1923
- Seats: 4 (1923–1961); 3 (1961–1977); 4 (1977–)
- TDs: Mary Butler (FF); David Cullinane (SF); John Cummins (FG); Conor D. McGuinness (SF)
- Local government area: Waterford City and County
- Created from: Waterford–Tipperary East
- EP constituency: South

Waterford is a parliamentary constituency represented in Dáil Éireann, the lower house of the Irish parliament or Oireachtas. The constituency elects four deputies (Teachtaí Dála, commonly known as TDs) on the system of proportional representation by means of the single transferable vote (PR-STV).

== Boundaries ==
The constituency was created by the Electoral Act 1923 and first used at the 1923 general election to the 4th Dáil, partially replacing the constituency of Waterford–Tipperary East that was used for the previous two elections. The Constituency Review Report 2023 of the Electoral Commission recommended that no change be made at the next general election.

The Electoral (Amendment) Act 2023 defines the constituency as:

"The city and county of Waterford."

Changes to the Waterford constituency
Years	TDs	Boundaries	Notes
1923–1937	4	The county of Waterford and the county borough of Waterford	Created from Waterford–Tipperary East (5 seats)
1937–1948	4	The county borough of Waterford, and the county of Waterford and in the county of Cork the district electoral divisions of Ardagh, Clonpriest, Kilcronat, Killeagh (Youghal), Kilmacdonogh, Youghal Rural, and the urban district of Youghal.	
1948–1961	4	The county borough of Waterford, and the county of Waterford.	Transfer to Cork East
1961–1977	3	The county of Waterford, except the part in the constituency of Tipperary South; and the county borough of Waterford.	Transfer to Tipperary South
1977–1981	4	The county of Waterford; and the county borough of Waterford.	Transfer from Tipperary South
1981–2002	4	The county of Waterford, except the part in the constituency of Tipperary South; and the county borough of Waterford.	Transfer to Tipperary South
2002–2016	4	The county of Waterford, except the part in the constituency of Tipperary South; and the city of Waterford.	
2016–	5	The city and county of Waterford.	Transfer from Tipperary South

== TDs ==
Teachtaí Dála (TDs) for Waterford 1923–
Key to parties: CnaT = Clann na Talmhan; CnaG = Cumann na nGaedheal; FP = Farmers' Party; FF = Fianna Fáil; FG = Fine Gael; GP = Green; Ind. = Independent; Lab = Labour; NCP = National Centre Party; NL = National League; PDs = Progressive Democrats; Rep = Republican; SF = Sinn Féin; SF–WP = Sinn Féin The Workers' Party
Dáil	Election	Deputy (Party)	Deputy (Party)	Deputy (Party)	Deputy (Party)
4th	1923	Caitlín Brugha (Rep)	John Butler (Lab)	Nicholas Wall (FP)	William Redmond (NL)
5th	1927 (Jun)	Caitlín Brugha (Rep)	Patrick Little (FF)	Vincent White (CnaG)	William Redmond (NL)
6th	1927 (Sep)	Seán Goulding (FF)	Patrick Little (FF)	Vincent White (CnaG)	William Redmond (NL)
7th	1932	Seán Goulding (FF)	Patrick Little (FF)	John Kiersey (CnaG)	William Redmond (CnaG)
8th	1933	Seán Goulding (FF)	Patrick Little (FF)	Nicholas Wall (NCP)	Bridget Redmond (CnaG)
9th	1937	Michael Morrissey (FF)	Patrick Little (FF)	Nicholas Wall (FG)	Bridget Redmond (FG)
10th	1938	Michael Morrissey (FF)	Patrick Little (FF)	William Broderick (FG)	Bridget Redmond (FG)
11th	1943	Michael Morrissey (FF)	Patrick Little (FF)	Denis Heskin (CnaT)	Bridget Redmond (FG)
12th	1944	Michael Morrissey (FF)	Patrick Little (FF)	Denis Heskin (CnaT)	Bridget Redmond (FG)
12th	1947 by-election	John Ormonde (FF)	Patrick Little (FF)	Denis Heskin (CnaT)	Bridget Redmond (FG)
13th	1948	John Ormonde (FF)	Patrick Little (FF)	Thomas Kyne (Lab)	Bridget Redmond (FG)
14th	1951	John Ormonde (FF)	Patrick Little (FF)	Thomas Kyne (Lab)	Bridget Redmond (FG)
14th	1952 by-election	John Ormonde (FF)	Patrick Little (FF)	Thomas Kyne (Lab)	William Kenneally (FF)
15th	1954	John Ormonde (FF)	Thaddeus Lynch (FG)	Thomas Kyne (Lab)	William Kenneally (FF)
16th	1957	John Ormonde (FF)	Thaddeus Lynch (FG)	Thomas Kyne (Lab)	William Kenneally (FF)
17th	1961	John Ormonde (FF)	Thaddeus Lynch (FG)	Thomas Kyne (Lab)	3 seats 1961–1977
18th	1965	Billy Kenneally (FF)	Thaddeus Lynch (FG)	Thomas Kyne (Lab)	3 seats 1961–1977
18th	1966 by-election	Billy Kenneally (FF)	Fad Browne (FF)	Thomas Kyne (Lab)	3 seats 1961–1977
19th	1969	Billy Kenneally (FF)	Fad Browne (FF)	Edward Collins (FG)	3 seats 1961–1977
20th	1973	Billy Kenneally (FF)	Thomas Kyne (Lab)	Edward Collins (FG)	3 seats 1961–1977
21st	1977	Billy Kenneally (FF)	Jackie Fahey (FF)	Edward Collins (FG)	Austin Deasy (FG)
22nd	1981	Billy Kenneally (FF)	Jackie Fahey (FF)	Edward Collins (FG)	Austin Deasy (FG)
23rd	1982 (Feb)	Paddy Gallagher (SF–WP)	Jackie Fahey (FF)	Edward Collins (FG)	Austin Deasy (FG)
24th	1982 (Nov)	Donal Ormonde (FF)	Jackie Fahey (FF)	Edward Collins (FG)	Austin Deasy (FG)
25th	1987	Martin Cullen (PDs)	Jackie Fahey (FF)	Brian Swift (FF)	Austin Deasy (FG)
26th	1989	Brian O'Shea (Lab)	Jackie Fahey (FF)	Brendan Kenneally (FF)	Austin Deasy (FG)
27th	1992	Brian O'Shea (Lab)	Martin Cullen (PDs)	Brendan Kenneally (FF)	Austin Deasy (FG)
28th	1997	Brian O'Shea (Lab)	Martin Cullen (FF)	Brendan Kenneally (FF)	Austin Deasy (FG)
29th	2002	Brian O'Shea (Lab)	Martin Cullen (FF)	Ollie Wilkinson (FF)	John Deasy (FG)
30th	2007	Brian O'Shea (Lab)	Martin Cullen (FF)	Brendan Kenneally (FF)	John Deasy (FG)
31st	2011	Ciara Conway (Lab)	John Halligan (Ind.)	Paudie Coffey (FG)	John Deasy (FG)
32nd	2016	David Cullinane (SF)	John Halligan (Ind.)	Mary Butler (FF)	John Deasy (FG)
33rd	2020	David Cullinane (SF)	Marc Ó Cathasaigh (GP)	Mary Butler (FF)	Matt Shanahan (Ind.)
34th	2024	David Cullinane (SF)	Conor D. McGuinness (SF)	Mary Butler (FF)	John Cummins (FG)

Note: The columns in this table are used only for presentational purposes, and no significance should be attached to the order of columns. For details of the order in which seats were won at each election, see the detailed results of that election.

== Elections ==
*: Outgoing TD

=== 2024 general election ===
2024 general election: Waterford
Party	Candidate	FPv%	Count											
Party	Candidate	FPv%	1	2	3	4	5	6	7	8	9	10	11	12
Sinn Féin	David Cullinane	22.3	11,936											
Fine Gael	John Cummins	19.3	10,376	10,428	10,432	10,441	10,453	10,482	10,526	10,719	11,159			
Fianna Fáil	Mary Butler	18.6	9,962	10,004	10,011	10,027	10,043	10,064	10,104	10,274	10,626	10,830		
Sinn Féin	Conor D. McGuinness (Note: Listed on the ballot paper as D. McGuinness, Conor)	10.8	5,791	6,692	6,716	6,735	6,882	7,013	7,123	7,259	7,396	7,414	7,825	9,519
Independent	Matt Shanahan	10.0	5,355	5,425	5,443	5,515	5,545	5,640	5,913	6,079	6,314	6,366	7,186	8,526
Social Democrats	Mary Roche	5.1	2,717	2,765	2,770	2,780	2,973	3,184	3,216	3,806	4,528	4,633	4,887	
Green	Marc Ó Cathasaigh	3.1	1,671	1,683	1,686	1,690	1,719	1,787	1,797	2,085				
Aontú	Ronan Cleary	3.1	1,664	1,680	1,693	1,822	1,858	1,879	2,149	2,207	2,257	2,262		
Labour	Sadhbh O'Neill	2.8	1,500	1,518	1,525	1,534	1,591	1,673	1,701					
Independent	Frank Conway	1.3	715	722	771	942	967	1,038						
PBP–Solidarity	Patrick Curtin (Note: Curtain is a member of People Before Profit.)	1.2	643	669	672	688								
Independent	Killian Mangan	1.1	620	627	668	695	798							
The Irish People	John D. Walsh	0.9	482	485	514									
Independent	Aaron Joyce	0.3	162	164										
Independent	Mark O'Neill	0.1	56	57										
Electorate: 97,153 Valid: 53,650 Spoilt: 363 Quota: 10,731 Turnout: 55.6%

=== 2020 general election ===
2020 general election: Waterford
Party	Candidate	FPv%	Count						
Party	Candidate	FPv%	1	2	3	4	5	6	7
Sinn Féin	David Cullinane	38.3	20,569						
Fianna Fáil	Mary Butler	12.4	6,644	7,306	7,720	8,939	9,867	10,028	11,233
Independent	Matt Shanahan	9.3	4,990	6,715	7,246	7,885	8,576	10,127	10,708
Fine Gael	John Cummins	8.5	4,592	5,036	5,119	5,484	5,784	5,880	8,477
Fine Gael	Damien Geoghegan	8.0	4,289	4,538	4,572	4,675	5,473	5,549	
Green	Marc Ó Cathasaigh	7.4	3,996	5,380	5,631	5,976	6,873	9,118	9,738
Labour	John Pratt	6.5	3,498	4,306	4,453	4,602			
Fianna Fáil	Eddie Mulligan	4.9	2,654	3,093	3,180				
Solidarity–PBP	Úna Dunphy (Note: Dunphy was a member of People Before Profit.)	2.1	1,153	4,361	4,829	4,944	5,444		
Aontú	Rónan Cleary	2.0	1,049	1,426					
Independent	Bernadette Philips	0.6	324	845					
Electorate: 84,978 Valid: 53,758 Spoilt: 447 Quota: 10,752 Turnout: 63.8%

=== 2016 general election ===
2016 general election: Waterford
Party	Candidate	FPv%	Count								
Party	Candidate	FPv%	1	2	3	4	5	6	7	8	9
Fianna Fáil	Mary Butler	20.5	10,603								
Sinn Féin	David Cullinane	18.8	9,739	9,783	9,826	9,890	9,967	10,497			
Independent	John Halligan	16.1	8,306	8,368	8,438	8,513	8,674	9,271	9,345	11,148	
Fine Gael	John Deasy	14.8	7,641	7,687	7,697	7,806	7,996	8,067	8,072	9,443	9,671
Fine Gael	Paudie Coffey	13.9	7,209	7,245	7,281	7,412	7,600	7,635	7,637	8,946	9,104
Labour	Ciara Conway	4.4	2,268	2,286	2,302	2,309	2,367	2,445	2,449		
Green	Grace O'Sullivan	4.3	2,237	2,254	2,285	2,379	2,567	2,968	2,993		
AAA–PBP	Una Dunphy	3.2	1,646	1,656	1,719	1,767	1,857				
Renua	Mailo Power	1.7	862	880	902	1,087					
Independent	John Walsh	1.7	858	865	895						
Direct Democracy	Edward Quilty	0.4	194	195							
Independent	Sheikh Ahmed	0.3	140	143							
Electorate: 81,819 Valid: 51,703 Spoilt: 400 Quota: 10,341 Turnout: 63.7%

=== 2011 general election ===
2011 general election: Waterford
Party	Candidate	FPv%	Count										
Party	Candidate	FPv%	1	2	3	4	5	6	7	8	9	10	11
Fine Gael	John Deasy	20.0	10,718	10,731	10,751								
Fine Gael	Paudie Coffey	18.1	9,698	9,705	9,737	9,774	9,852	9,999	10,055	10,703	11,236		
Fianna Fáil	Brendan Kenneally	14.0	7,515	7,521	7,555	7,567	7,600	7,672	7,736	7,968	8,207	8,782	8,845
Labour	Ciara Conway	10.3	5,554	5,560	5,565	5,597	5,708	5,867	5,937	6,424	9,216	11,182	
Independent	John Halligan	10.3	5,546	5,552	5,569	5,594	5,639	5,776	6,051	6,448	7,373	9,602	9,818
Sinn Féin	David Cullinane	9.9	5,342	5,347	5,361	5,387	5,414	5,458	5,636	5,868	6,298		
Labour	Seamus Ryan	8.6	4,638	4,644	4,652	4,664	4,730	4,791	4,971	5,113			
Independent	Tom Higgins	2.1	1,130	1,133	1,150	1,164	1,201	1,227	1,246				
Independent	Justin Collery	1.8	967	971	983	1,025	1,075	1,129	1,166				
Workers' Party	Joe Tobin	1.6	873	878	889	906	925	937					
Independent	Joe Conway	1.3	725	729	738	751	762						
Green	Jody Power	0.9	462	462	465	501							
Fís Nua	Ben Nutty (Note: Although Fís Nua was registered as a political party on 4 February 2011, the party's name did not appear on the ballot, as the Register of Political Parties in use was that in force on 1 February 2011, when the writ for the general election was issued.)	0.5	257	261	276								
Independent	Declan Waters	0.4	222	223									
Independent	Gerard Kiersey	0.1	73										
Electorate: 78,435 Valid: 53,720 Spoilt: 578 (1.1%) Quota: 10,745 Turnout: 54,298 (69.2%)

=== 2007 general election ===
2007 general election: Waterford
Party	Candidate	FPv%	Count										
Party	Candidate	FPv%	1	2	3	4	5	6	7	8	9	10	11
Fianna Fáil	Martin Cullen	23.1	11,438										
Fine Gael	John Deasy	15.3	7,554	7,674	7,712	7,839	8,006	8,546	8,778	9,565	13,181		
Fianna Fáil	Ollie Wilkinson	12.0	5,963	6,221	6,258	6,319	6,376	6,395	6,443	6,766	7,159	7,549	7,874
Fianna Fáil	Brendan Kenneally	11.4	5,624	6,384	6,423	6,561	6,631	6,699	6,995	7,663	8,032	8,472	8,848
Labour	Brian O'Shea	11.3	5,610	5,746	5,774	5,962	6,326	6,545	7,086	8,198	9,258	11,217	
Fine Gael	Paudie Coffey	9.4	4,658	4,706	4,732	4,825	4,935	5,382	5,522	5,894			
Sinn Féin	David Cullinane	6.7	3,327	3,390	3,415	3,487	3,631	3,697	4,296				
Workers' Party	John Halligan	3.4	1,708	1,768	1,784	1,869	2,001	2,093					
Fine Gael	Jim D'Arcy	2.7	1,340	1,372	1,378	1,433	1,519						
Green	Brendan McCann	2.1	1,049	1,062	1,085	1,206							
Independent	Mary Roche	1.9	934	973	1,014								
Independent	Declan Waters	1.5	270	271									
Independent	Francis Hennessy	0.1	53	55									
Electorate: 73,434 Valid: 49,528 Spoilt: 430 (0.9%) Quota: 9,606 Turnout: 49,958 (68.0%)

Martin Cullen resigned as a TD on 24 March 2010. On 19 May 2010, a Fine Gael motion to issue the writ of election to fill the vacancy, opposed by the Fianna Fáil–Green Party government, was defeated by 72 to 77. On 29 September 2010, a second Fine Gael motion to issue the writ was defeated by a vote of 77 to 81. On 4 November 2010, a third Fine Gael motion to issue the writ was defeated by 72 to 76. The seat remained vacant until the dissolution of the 30th Dáil on 1 February 2011.

=== 2002 general election ===
2002 general election: Waterford
Party	Candidate	FPv%	Count						
Party	Candidate	FPv%	1	2	3	4	5	6	7
Fianna Fáil	Martin Cullen	18.3	8,529	8,606	8,734	8,854	9,432		
Fianna Fáil	Ollie Wilkinson	15.7	7,312	7,367	7,383	7,443	7,635	7,723	8,204
Fine Gael	John Deasy	15.5	7,204	7,303	7,363	7,581	8,118	9,998	
Labour	Brian O'Shea	13.4	6,219	6,364	6,649	7,182	7,649	8,316	9,524
Fianna Fáil	Brendan Kenneally	12.3	5,735	5,780	5,920	5,969	6,165	6,425	7,117
Sinn Féin	David Cullinane	6.4	2,955	3,090	3,410	3,585	3,714	3,871	
Fine Gael	Maurice Cummins	6.0	2,799	2,862	3,009	3,121	3,341		
Progressive Democrats	Michael Flynn	4.6	2,137	2,187	2,251	2,464			
Green	Brendan McCann	2.9	1,361	1,533	1,646				
Workers' Party	John Halligan	2.7	1,270	1,398					
Christian Solidarity	Declan Waters	0.7	335						
Socialist Workers	Jimmy Kelly	0.6	300						
Independent	Conor Halpin	0.6	289						
Independent	Eddie Walsh	0.3	118						
Electorate: 73,725 Valid: 46,563 Spoilt: 557 (1.2%) Quota: 9,313 Turnout: 47,120 (63.9%)

=== 1997 general election ===
1997 general election: Waterford
Party	Candidate	FPv%	Count								
Party	Candidate	FPv%	1	2	3	4	5	6	7	8	9
Fine Gael	Austin Deasy	16.4	7,335	7,349	7,377	7,537	7,948	8,743	11,277		
Fianna Fáil	Brendan Kenneally	13.3	5,971	5,983	6,020	6,235	6,796	7,217	7,425	7,564	10,080
Fianna Fáil	Martin Cullen	12.0	5,353	5,385	5,417	5,545	6,527	6,899	7,184	7,330	8,729
Labour	Brian O'Shea	11.8	5,271	5,281	5,356	5,588	5,828	6,335	7,124	8,687	9,273
Fianna Fáil	Ollie Wilkinson	10.5	4,707	4,725	4,744	4,904	5,110	5,418	5,485	5,562	
Workers' Party	Martin O'Regan	9.2	4,139	4,147	4,502	4,689	4,788	5,149	5,494	5,692	5,783
Fine Gael	Maurice Cummins	8.2	3,664	3,670	3,686	3,841	4,124	4,380			
Independent	Dermot Kirwan	6.6	2,946	2,952	2,986	3,183	3,356				
Progressive Democrats	Katharine Bulbulia	6.5	2,896	2,902	2,923	3,083					
National Party	Declan Waters	1.9	855	863	874						
Green	Brendan McCann	1.8	809	821	869						
Socialist Workers	Jimmy Kelly	1.6	702	708							
Natural Law	Michael Kennedy	0.3	149								
Electorate: 69,789 Valid: 44,797 Spoilt: 667 (1.5%) Quota: 8,960 Turnout: 45,464 (65.1%)

=== 1992 general election ===
1992 general election: Waterford
Party	Candidate	FPv%	Count						
Party	Candidate	FPv%	1	2	3	4	5	6	7
Labour	Brian O'Shea	26.1	11,235						
Fine Gael	Austin Deasy	18.0	7,723	8,305	8,364	8,634			
Fianna Fáil	Brendan Kenneally	15.8	6,793	7,055	7,148	7,416	7,527	7,756	8,380
Fianna Fáil	Jackie Fahey	13.0	5,410	5,548	5,616	5,800	5,876	5,974	6,367
Progressive Democrats	Martin Cullen	9.3	4,015	4,440	4,497	4,670	4,917	5,915	6,739
Workers' Party	Martin O'Regan	7.0	3,000	3,451	3,617	3,739	4,338	4,676	
Fine Gael	Maurice Cummins	4.2	1,788	1,984	2,009	2,126	2,282		
Democratic Left	Paddy Gallagher	2.4	1,039	1,459	1,513	1,568			
Independent	Tony Scott	3.1	1,312	1,411	1,488				
Sinn Féin	Denis O'Brien	1.2	511	539					
Independent	Breda Hayden	0.4	161	197					
Electorate: 64,037 Valid: 42,987 Spoilt: 676 (1.6%) Quota: 8,598 Turnout: 43,663 (68.2%)

=== 1989 general election ===
1989 general election: Waterford
Party	Candidate	FPv%	Count				
Party	Candidate	FPv%	1	2	3	4	5
Labour	Brian O'Shea	18.9	7,823	7,969	8,208	8,405	
Fine Gael	Austin Deasy	18.3	7,571	7,668	9,739		
Fianna Fáil	Jackie Fahey	16.9	6,991	7,570	7,638	7,685	8,282
Fianna Fáil	Brendan Kenneally	13.3	5,486	6,420	6,502	6,549	7,147
Workers' Party	Paddy Gallagher	11.1	4,570	4,691	4,830	4,913	
Progressive Democrats	Martin Cullen	8.4	3,489	3,534	4,245	5,345	6,670
Fine Gael	Katharine Bulbulia	8.1	3,340	3,379			
Fianna Fáil	Brian Swift	4.6	1,891				
Independent	Padraig Sweeney	0.4	159				
Electorate: 60,504 Valid: 41,320 Quota: 8,265 Turnout: 68.3%

=== 1987 general election ===
1987 general election: Waterford
Party	Candidate	FPv%	Count						
Party	Candidate	FPv%	1	2	3	4	5	6	7
Fine Gael	Austin Deasy	18.9	8,430	8,569	8,794	11,708			
Fianna Fáil	Jackie Fahey	16.4	7,321	7,517	7,847	7,962	8,049	8,648	8,855
Fianna Fáil	Donal Ormonde	13.4	5,959	6,091	6,340	6,439	6,530	6,984	7,119
Fianna Fáil	Brian Swift	12.8	5,720	5,906	6,355	6,496	6,607	7,620	7,930
Progressive Democrats	Martin Cullen	12.0	5,347	5,427	5,861	6,444	8,225	9,723	
Fine Gael	Edward Collins	8.9	3,990	4,035	4,178				
Labour	Brian O'Shea	7.5	3,358	3,517	4,442	4,636	5,069		
Workers' Party	Paddy Gallagher	6.4	2,855	3,408					
Sinn Féin	Noel Ryan	1.7	758						
Workers' Party	Anthony Wright	1.2	552						
Independent	Pádraig Sweeney	0.5	226						
Independent	John Lanigan	0.2	78						
Electorate: 59,904 Valid: 44,594 Quota: 8,919 Turnout: 74.4%

=== November 1982 general election ===
November 1982 general election: Waterford
Party	Candidate	FPv%	Count						
Party	Candidate	FPv%	1	2	3	4	5	6	7
Fine Gael	Austin Deasy	19.8	8,495	8,904					
Fianna Fáil	Donal Ormonde	16.3	6,983	7,086	7,098	7,354	7,536	9,796	
Fianna Fáil	Jackie Fahey	14.5	6,230	6,335	6,351	6,576	6,709	7,787	8,917
Fine Gael	Edward Collins	12.7	5,442	5,660	5,795	6,278	9,006		
Workers' Party	Paddy Gallagher	10.7	4,577	5,095	5,156	5,972	6,423	6,927	7,019
Fianna Fáil	Brian Swift	8.1	3,487	3,649	3,654	3,957	4,136		
Fine Gael	Katharine Bulbulia	7.1	3,034	3,263	3,342	3,885			
Independent	Thomas Brennan	6.0	2,574	2,785	2,807				
Labour	Brian O'Shea	4.1	1,760						
Independent	Terence Moroney	0.7	285						
Electorate: 56,754 Valid: 42,867 Quota: 8,574 Turnout: 75.5%

=== February 1982 general election ===
February 1982 general election: Waterford
Party	Candidate	FPv%	Count				
Party	Candidate	FPv%	1	2	3	4	5
Fine Gael	Austin Deasy	22.4	9,295				
Fianna Fáil	Jackie Fahey	16.3	6,762	6,813	6,871	6,986	8,858
Sinn Féin The Workers' Party	Paddy Gallagher	16.1	6,671	6,959	7,026	7,815	8,178
Fine Gael	Edward Collins	15.4	6,419	6,516	7,218	8,087	8,260
Fianna Fáil	Donal Ormonde	12.2	5,058	5,118	5,173	5,312	7,620
Fianna Fáil	Billy Kenneally	11.1	4,623	4,705	4,729	4,853	
Labour	Brian O'Shea	4.8	1,982	2,094	2,169		
Independent	Vincent O'Toole	1.8	756				
Electorate: 55,786 Valid: 41,566 Quota: 8,314 Turnout: 74.5%

=== 1981 general election ===
1981 general election: Waterford
Party	Candidate	FPv%	Count						
Party	Candidate	FPv%	1	2	3	4	5	6	7
Fine Gael	Austin Deasy	19.7	8,625	9,340					
Fianna Fáil	Jackie Fahey	19.0	8,314	8,432	8,499	9,583			
Fine Gael	Edward Collins	13.8	6,022	6,223	6,445	6,589	6,629	6,987	9,859
Fianna Fáil	Billy Kenneally	11.9	5,183	5,237	5,257	6,835	7,511	8,363	8,792
Fine Gael	Katharine Bulbulia	8.4	3,691	3,812	3,939	4,169	4,217	4,617	
Sinn Féin The Workers' Party	Paddy Gallagher	7.9	3,463	3,679	3,772	4,044	4,092	5,439	6,255
Fianna Fáil	Brian Swift	7.9	3,456	3,482	3,494				
Anti H-Block	Kevin Lynch	7.6	3,337	3,464	3,518	3,653	3,679		
Labour	William Kyne	3.7	1,632						
Electorate: 55,786 Valid: 43,723 Quota: 8,745 Turnout: 78.4%

=== 1977 general election ===
1977 general election: Waterford
Party	Candidate	FPv%	Count							
Party	Candidate	FPv%	1	2	3	4	5	6	7	8
Fianna Fáil	Billy Kenneally	18.9	8,061	8,100	8,288	8,721				
Fine Gael	Austin Deasy	17.2	7,333	7,404	7,855	8,006	8,028	8,033	9,142	
Fianna Fáil	Jackie Fahey	16.9	7,214	7,243	7,535	8,595				
Fine Gael	Edward Collins	13.4	5,726	5,752	5,990	6,010	6,013	6,013	6,870	7,188
Sinn Féin The Workers' Party	Paddy Gallagher	10.6	4,500	4,529	4,574	4,621	4,628	4,630	5,067	5,619
Fianna Fáil	Ria O'Brien	6.4	2,738	2,775	2,858	3,700	3,861	3,922	4,059	
Labour	Frank King	6.3	2,679	2,697	2,752	2,782	2,784	2,785		
Fianna Fáil	Seán Whelan	5.9	2,508	2,518	2,642					
Independent	Patrick Crotty	3.7	1,560	1,597						
Independent	Patrick Kirwan	0.7	306							
Electorate: 53,811 Valid: 42,625 Quota: 8,526 Turnout: 79.2%

=== 1973 general election ===
1973 general election: Waterford
Party	Candidate	FPv%	Count			
Party	Candidate	FPv%	1	2	3	4
Fine Gael	Edward Collins	21.8	6,719	6,766	9,827	
Fianna Fáil	Billy Kenneally	21.4	6,607	7,461	7,645	7,707
Fianna Fáil	Fad Browne	19.6	6,047	6,770	6,891	6,939
Labour	Thomas Kyne	16.0	4,939	5,044	6,344	8,347
Fine Gael	Austin Deasy	15.1	4,658	4,772		
Fianna Fáil	Charles Curran	6.1	1,882			
Electorate: 39,513 Valid: 30,852 Quota: 7,714 Turnout: 78.1%

=== 1969 general election ===
1969 general election: Waterford
Party	Candidate	FPv%	Count				
Party	Candidate	FPv%	1	2	3	4	5
Fine Gael	Edward Collins	21.2	6,338	6,373	6,860	9,384	
Fianna Fáil	Billy Kenneally	20.6	6,165	7,236	7,484		
Fianna Fáil	Fad Browne	18.9	5,652	6,331	6,718	6,836	6,967
Labour	Thomas Kyne	11.4	3,395	3,551	5,327	5,842	6,866
Fine Gael	Austin Deasy	10.6	3,171	3,264	3,328		
Labour	Thomas Brennan	10.2	3,029	3,053			
Fianna Fáil	Seán Whelan	7.1	2,118				
Electorate: 38,041 Valid: 29,868 Quota: 7,468 Turnout: 78.5%

=== 1966 by-election ===
Fine Gael TD Thaddeus Lynch died on 25 October 1966. A by-election was held to fill the vacancy on 7 December 1966.

1966 by-election: Waterford
Party	Candidate	FPv%	Count	
Party	Candidate	FPv%	1	2
Fianna Fáil	Fad Browne	42.6	12,181	13,853
Fine Gael	Edward Collins	33.7	9,617	13,178
Labour	John Griffin	23.7	6,783	
Electorate: 36,986 Valid: 28,581 Quota: 14,291 Turnout: 77.3%

=== 1965 general election ===
1965 general election: Waterford
Party	Candidate	FPv%	Count		
Party	Candidate	FPv%	1	2	3
Fianna Fáil	Billy Kenneally	27.4	7,444		
Labour	Thomas Kyne	24.6	6,694	6,788	7,118
Fianna Fáil	John Ormonde	20.8	5,652	6,163	6,306
Fine Gael	Thaddeus Lynch	19.8	5,380	5,410	6,890
Fine Gael	Richard Walsh	7.5	2,033	2,041	
Electorate: 36,409 Valid: 27,203 Quota: 6,801 Turnout: 74.7%

=== 1961 general election ===
1961 general election: Waterford
Party	Candidate	FPv%	Count			
Party	Candidate	FPv%	1	2	3	4
Labour	Thomas Kyne	29.9	7,917			
Fianna Fáil	John Ormonde	23.1	6,112	6,406	6,578	6,732
Fine Gael	Thaddeus Lynch	18.9	5,016	5,555	5,662	7,618
Fianna Fáil	Billy Kenneally	17.0	4,504	4,727	4,868	5,110
Fine Gael	William Foran	8.9	2,365	2,485	2,527	
Sinn Féin	Alfonsus Ó Riain	2.3	601	713		
Electorate: 35,794 Valid: 26,515 Quota: 6,629 Turnout: 74.1%

=== 1957 general election ===
1957 general election: Waterford
Party	Candidate	FPv%	Count			
Party	Candidate	FPv%	1	2	3	4
Fianna Fáil	William Kenneally	24.4	7,416			
Fianna Fáil	John Ormonde	20.0	6,079	7,041		
Labour	Thomas Kyne	18.3	5,567	5,737	5,785	6,148
Fine Gael	Thaddeus Lynch	17.0	5,161	5,217	5,239	7,499
Fianna Fáil	James Quirke	10.6	3,221	3,353	4,209	4,403
Fine Gael	Norman Walsh	9.7	2,958	2,973	3,007	
Electorate: 44,215 Valid: 30,402 Quota: 6,081 Turnout: 68.8%

=== 1954 general election ===
1954 general election: Waterford
Party	Candidate	FPv%	Count		
Party	Candidate	FPv%	1	2	3
Fianna Fáil	William Kenneally	22.7	7,777		
Fine Gael	Thaddeus Lynch	20.4	6,991		
Labour	Thomas Kyne	20.0	6,860		
Fianna Fáil	John Ormonde	15.1	5,162	5,568	8,786
Fine Gael	Norman Walsh	12.4	4,265	4,289	4,449
Fianna Fáil	Daniel Leahy	9.4	3,234	3,723	
Electorate: 44,522 Valid: 34,289 Quota: 6,858 Turnout: 77.0%

=== 1952 by-election ===
Fine Gael TD Bridget Redmond died on 3 May 1952. A by-election was held to fill the vacancy on 26 June 1952.

1952 by-election: Waterford
Party	Candidate	FPv%	Count	
Party	Candidate	FPv%	1	2
Fianna Fáil	William Kenneally	45.2	15,532	17,005
Fine Gael	Thaddeus Lynch	34.1	11,714	16,448
Labour	John Griffin	20.8	7,153	
Electorate: 44,797 Valid: 34,399 Quota: 17,200 Turnout: 76.8%

=== 1951 general election ===
1951 general election: Waterford
Party	Candidate	FPv%	Count			
Party	Candidate	FPv%	1	2	3	4
Fine Gael	Bridget Redmond	24.6	8,372			
Labour	Thomas Kyne	19.0	6,472	6,799	9,091	
Fianna Fáil	Patrick Little	17.0	5,798	5,853	6,005	6,105
Fianna Fáil	John Ormonde	16.2	5,523	5,599	5,856	6,038
Fianna Fáil	Daniel Leahy	14.3	4,873	4,917	5,326	5,749
Fine Gael	Thomas Flynn	8.8	3,010	4,070		
Electorate: 44,713 Valid: 34,048 Quota: 6,810 Turnout: 76.2%

=== 1948 general election ===
1948 general election: Waterford
Party	Candidate	FPv%	Count						
Party	Candidate	FPv%	1	2	3	4	5	6	7
Fine Gael	Bridget Redmond	19.6	6,810	6,929	7,850				
Fianna Fáil	Patrick Little	18.0	6,236	6,271	6,293	6,332	7,640		
Labour	Thomas Kyne	17.5	6,066	6,189	6,219	6,304	6,359	6,367	7,441
Fianna Fáil	John Ormonde	16.3	5,645	5,685	5,703	5,739	6,490	7,164	
Clann na Talmhan	Denis Heskin	10.8	3,750	3,812	4,009	4,528	4,655	4,672	5,147
Fianna Fáil	Daniel Leahy	6.6	2,285	2,299	2,310	2,320			
Clann na Poblachta	Ruairí Brugha	4.6	1,582	2,242	2,256	2,323	2,345	2,346	
Fine Gael	Nicholas Sheehan	3.5	1,223	1,237					
Clann na Poblachta	Edward Dawson	3.2	1,098						
Electorate: 45,795 Valid: 34,695 Quota: 6,940 Turnout: 75.8%

=== 1947 by-election ===
Fianna Fáil TD Michael Morrissey died on 10 May 1947. A by-election was held to fill the vacancy on 29 October 1947.

1947 by-election: Waterford
Party	Candidate	FPv%	Count		
Party	Candidate	FPv%	1	2	3
Fianna Fáil	John Ormonde	36.8	11,840	12,361	15,318
Fine Gael	Nicholas Sheehan	30.9	9,941	10,402	12,565
Labour	Thomas Kyne	23.8	7,683	8,906	
Clann na Poblachta	Seán Feeney	8.6	2,758		
Electorate: 51,008 Valid: 32,222 Quota: 16,112 Turnout: 63.2%

=== 1944 general election ===
1944 general election: Waterford
Party	Candidate	FPv%	Count			
Party	Candidate	FPv%	1	2	3	4
Fine Gael	Bridget Redmond	21.6	8,061			
Fianna Fáil	Patrick Little	20.3	7,562			
Fianna Fáil	Michael Morrissey	18.2	6,772	6,809	6,963	8,036
Clann na Talmhan	Denis Heskin	15.1	5,615	5,961	6,075	7,754
Fianna Fáil	Seán Goulding	13.2	4,925	4,939	5,141	5,538
Labour	David Hanley	9.7	3,634	3,828	3,999	
Ailtirí na hAiséirghe	Liam Walsh	2.0	739	747		
Electorate: 52,162 Valid: 37,308 Quota: 7,462 Turnout: 71.5%

=== 1943 general election ===
1943 general election: Waterford
Party	Candidate	FPv%	Count								
Party	Candidate	FPv%	1	2	3	4	5	6	7	8	9
Fianna Fáil	Patrick Little	19.7	7,820	7,974							
Fine Gael	Bridget Redmond	19.6	7,765	7,810	8,017						
Fianna Fáil	Michael Morrissey	15.6	6,197	6,409	6,524	6,528	6,548	6,827	7,246	10,873	
Fianna Fáil	Seán Goulding	10.8	4,274	4,381	4,433	4,436	4,456	4,524	4,765		
Labour	James O'Connor	7.4	2,916	3,063	3,102	3,105	3,107	4,731	5,126	5,320	5,812
Clann na Talmhan	Denis Heskin	7.3	2,877	2,916	4,523	4,575	4,576	4,736	5,695	6,092	6,312
Labour	Jerome Guiry	6.0	2,362	2,426	2,456	2,458	2,459				
Fine Gael	John Butler	5.9	2,350	2,372	2,468	2,492	2,493	2,654			
Clann na Talmhan	Walter Norris	5.4	2,155	2,191							
Ailtirí na hAiséirghe	Tomás Ó Dochartaigh	2.3	926								
Electorate: 52,162 Valid: 39,642 Quota: 7,929 Turnout: 76.0%

=== 1938 general election ===
1938 general election: Waterford
Party	Candidate	FPv%	Count					
Party	Candidate	FPv%	1	2	3	4	5	6
Fianna Fáil	Michael Morrissey	19.5	8,067	8,658				
Fine Gael	Bridget Redmond	18.1	7,514	8,148	10,643			
Fianna Fáil	Patrick Little	17.8	7,381	7,694	7,775	7,832	7,929	8,154
Fianna Fáil	Seán Goulding	17.1	7,094	7,387	7,450	7,490	7,671	7,812
Fine Gael	William Broderick	11.7	4,832	4,997	6,628	8,708		
Fine Gael	Nicholas Wall	10.2	4,248	4,366				
Labour	Charles O'Rourke	5.6	2,323					
Electorate: 51,492 Valid: 41,459 Quota: 8,292 Turnout: 80.5%

=== 1937 general election ===
1937 general election: Waterford
Party	Candidate	FPv%	Count				
Party	Candidate	FPv%	1	2	3	4	5
Fine Gael	Bridget Redmond	20.4	8,254				
Fianna Fáil	Patrick Little	19.1	7,712	8,594			
Fianna Fáil	Michael Morrissey	15.1	6,113	6,817	7,056	7,445	7,581
Fianna Fáil	Seán Goulding	13.7	5,528	6,536	6,781	7,105	7,173
Fine Gael	Nicholas Wall	11.8	4,784	5,130	5,148	8,513	
Fine Gael	John Butler	10.5	4,235	4,702	4,714		
Labour	Daniel Foley	7.9	3,179				
Independent	William Jones	1.5	592				
Electorate: 51,596 Valid: 40,397 Quota: 8,080 Turnout: 78.3%

=== 1933 general election ===
1933 general election: Waterford
Party	Candidate	FPv%	Count					
Party	Candidate	FPv%	1	2	3	4	5	6
Fianna Fáil	Patrick Little	18.1	7,007	7,118	7,225	7,359	7,381	7,467
Cumann na nGaedheal	Bridget Redmond	17.7	6,849	7,002	8,498			
Fianna Fáil	Seán Goulding	17.1	6,615	6,792	6,842	6,878	6,915	7,025
Fianna Fáil	Michael Mansfield	15.0	5,783	5,989	6,062	6,155	6,188	6,301
National Centre Party	Nicholas Wall	13.5	5,228	5,297	6,053	8,935		
Cumann na nGaedheal	Vincent White	9.1	3,506	3,560	3,912			
Cumann na nGaedheal	John Kiersey	7.3	2,827	2,856				
Labour	Thomas Ryan	2.2	834					
Electorate: 45,770 Valid: 38,649 Quota: 7,730 Turnout: 84.4%

=== 1932 general election ===
1932 general election: Waterford
Party	Candidate	FPv%	Count			
Party	Candidate	FPv%	1	2	3	4
Cumann na nGaedheal	William Redmond	20.8	7,276			
Fianna Fáil	Seán Goulding	16.7	5,835	6,935	7,020	
Fianna Fáil	Patrick Little	15.2	5,316	5,811	6,076	6,257
Cumann na nGaedheal	John Kiersey	13.4	4,691	4,984	8,494	
Fianna Fáil	Michael Mansfield	13.0	4,548	5,087	5,336	5,554
Cumann na nGaedheal	Vincent White	11.9	4,165	4,654		
Labour	Daniel Foley	9.0	3,147			
Electorate: 45,277 Valid: 34,978 Quota: 6,996 Turnout: 77.3%

=== September 1927 general election ===
September 1927 general election: Waterford
Party	Candidate	FPv%	Count	
Party	Candidate	FPv%	1	2
National League	William Redmond	20.6	6,623	
Fianna Fáil	Patrick Little	20.1	6,434	
Fianna Fáil	Seán Goulding	17.9	5,744	6,944
Cumann na nGaedheal	Vincent White	17.4	5,595	6,184
Farmers' Party	Nicholas Wall	14.3	4,583	5,156
Independent	John Butler	9.7	3,118	
Electorate: 45,276 Valid: 32,097 Quota: 6,420 Turnout: 70.9%

=== June 1927 general election ===
June 1927 general election: Waterford
Party	Candidate	FPv%	Count									
Party	Candidate	FPv%	1	2	3	4	5	6	7	8	9	10
National League	William Redmond	24.3	7,687									
Cumann na nGaedheal	Vincent White	12.1	3,806	4,036	4,073	4,835	4,920	5,067	5,102	5,456	7,157	
Fianna Fáil	Patrick Little	11.9	3,769	3,832	3,867	3,894	3,951	4,026	5,417	5,778	5,902	5,935
Sinn Féin	Caitlín Brugha	11.3	3,579	3,639	3,676	3,708	3,756	3,968	4,265	4,638	4,814	4,855
Independent	John Butler	8.0	2,534	2,678	2,712	2,909	3,035	3,487	3,649	4,000	4,370	4,598
Farmers' Party	Nicholas Wall	6.9	2,187	2,361	2,372	2,466	3,261	3,556	3,719	3,854		
Fianna Fáil	Michael O'Ryan	6.3	1,988	2,025	2,031	2,047	2,097	2,251				
Independent	Declan Conway	4.6	1,453	1,500	1,510	1,597	1,750					
Labour	Richard Keane	4.1	1,299	1,526	2,202	2,239	2,274	2,336	2,373			
Cumann na nGaedheal	James Daly	4.1	1,297	1,349	1,355							
Farmers' Party	Michael O'Brien	3.8	1,189	1,414	1,426	1,480						
Labour	Thomas Dunne	2.5	795	906								
Electorate: 45,276 Valid: 31,583 Quota: 6,317 Turnout: 69.8%

=== 1923 general election ===
1923 general election: Waterford
Party	Candidate	FPv%	Count							
Party	Candidate	FPv%	1	2	3	4	5	6	7	8
Republican	Caitlín Brugha	25.4	8,265							
Independent	William Redmond	19.8	6,441	6,626						
Cumann na nGaedheal	Vincent White	12.5	4,059	4,091	4,448	5,084	5,295	5,304	5,396	5,627
Labour	James Baird	9.8	3,186	3,703	3,734	3,829	3,845	3,870		
Farmers' Party	Nicholas Wall	9.7	3,142	3,235	3,279	3,607	5,769	5,797	5,829	5,949
Labour	John Butler	8.3	2,710	3,351	3,463	3,744	3,830	3,882	7,222	
Farmers' Party	Garrett Flavin	7.0	2,280	2,414	2,494	2,784				
Independent	Richard Keane	5.3	1,741	1,873	1,949					
Cumann na nGaedheal	Michael Brennock	2.3	735	754						
Electorate: 45,849 Valid: 32,559 Quota: 6,512 Turnout: 71.0%

== See also ==
- Dáil constituencies
- Elections in the Republic of Ireland
- Politics of the Republic of Ireland
- List of Dáil by-elections
- List of political parties in the Republic of Ireland
