= Brian O'Shea (politician) =

Irish politician (1944–2026

Minister of State
- 1994–1997: Health
- 1993–1994: Agriculture, Food and Forestry

Teachta Dála
- In office June 1989 – February 2011
- Constituency: Waterford

Senator
- In office 25 April 1987 – 15 June 1989
- Constituency: Industrial and Commercial Panel

Personal details
- Born: 9 December 1944 Waterford, Ireland
- Died: 28 January 2026 (aged 81) Waterford, Ireland
- Party: Labour Party
- Spouse: Eileen Walsh (m. 1978)
- Children: 6
- Education: St Patrick's College, Dublin

Brian O'Shea (9 December 1944 – 28 January 2026) was an Irish Labour Party politician who served as Minister of State at the Department of Health from 1994 to 1997 and Minister of State at the Department of Agriculture, Food and the Marine from 1993 to 1994. He served as a Teachta Dála (TD) for the Waterford constituency from 1989 to 2011.

== Life and career ==
O'Shea was born in Waterford on 9 December 1944. He was educated at Mount Sion CBS, Waterford and St Patrick's College, Dublin. O'Shea worked as a teacher before entering politics. He was elected to Tramore Town Council in 1979, and in 1985 was elected to Waterford City Council and Waterford County Council. He served on these local authorities until 1993.

He first stood for election to Dáil Éireann at the February 1982 general election but was unsuccessful. He stood again at the November 1982 and 1987 general elections but was not elected on either occasion. O'Shea was elected to Seanad Éireann in 1987 as a senator for the Industrial and Commercial Panel. Two years later, at the 1989 general election he was first elected to the Dáil for the Waterford constituency.

In 1993, O'Shea was appointed Minister of State at the Department of Agriculture and Food with responsibility for Food and Horticulture. In 1994, he was appointed Minister of State at the Department of Health with responsibility for Mental Handicap, Public Health and Food Safety. He was party spokesperson for Defence (1997–1998); Education; Arts, Heritage, Gaeltacht and the Islands; Communications and Sport (1998–2002); Community, Rural and Gaeltacht Affairs (2002–2007); and Defence and the Irish language (2007–2011).

O'Shea retired from politics at the 2011 general election.

O'Shea died on 28 January 2026, at the age of 81.

Political offices
Preceded by Liam Hyland	Minister of State at the Department of Agriculture and Food; 1993–1994	Succeeded by Jimmy Deenihan
Preceded by Willie O'Dea	Minister of State at the Department of Health; 1994–1997	Succeeded by Tom Moffatt
Party political offices
Preceded by Breeda Moynihan-Cronin	Chair of the Labour Party; 2007–2012	Succeeded by Colm Keaveney

Dáil	Election	Deputy (Party)	Deputy (Party)	Deputy (Party)	Deputy (Party)
4th	1923	Caitlín Brugha (Rep)	John Butler (Lab)	Nicholas Wall (FP)	William Redmond (NL)
5th	1927 (Jun)	Caitlín Brugha (Rep)	Patrick Little (FF)	Vincent White (CnaG)	William Redmond (NL)
6th	1927 (Sep)	Seán Goulding (FF)	Patrick Little (FF)	Vincent White (CnaG)	William Redmond (NL)
7th	1932	Seán Goulding (FF)	Patrick Little (FF)	John Kiersey (CnaG)	William Redmond (CnaG)
8th	1933	Seán Goulding (FF)	Patrick Little (FF)	Nicholas Wall (NCP)	Bridget Redmond (CnaG)
9th	1937	Michael Morrissey (FF)	Patrick Little (FF)	Nicholas Wall (FG)	Bridget Redmond (FG)
10th	1938	Michael Morrissey (FF)	Patrick Little (FF)	William Broderick (FG)	Bridget Redmond (FG)
11th	1943	Michael Morrissey (FF)	Patrick Little (FF)	Denis Heskin (CnaT)	Bridget Redmond (FG)
12th	1944	Michael Morrissey (FF)	Patrick Little (FF)	Denis Heskin (CnaT)	Bridget Redmond (FG)
12th	1947 by-election	John Ormonde (FF)	Patrick Little (FF)	Denis Heskin (CnaT)	Bridget Redmond (FG)
13th	1948	John Ormonde (FF)	Patrick Little (FF)	Thomas Kyne (Lab)	Bridget Redmond (FG)
14th	1951	John Ormonde (FF)	Patrick Little (FF)	Thomas Kyne (Lab)	Bridget Redmond (FG)
14th	1952 by-election	John Ormonde (FF)	Patrick Little (FF)	Thomas Kyne (Lab)	William Kenneally (FF)
15th	1954	John Ormonde (FF)	Thaddeus Lynch (FG)	Thomas Kyne (Lab)	William Kenneally (FF)
16th	1957	John Ormonde (FF)	Thaddeus Lynch (FG)	Thomas Kyne (Lab)	William Kenneally (FF)
17th	1961	John Ormonde (FF)	Thaddeus Lynch (FG)	Thomas Kyne (Lab)	3 seats 1961–1977
18th	1965	Billy Kenneally (FF)	Thaddeus Lynch (FG)	Thomas Kyne (Lab)	3 seats 1961–1977
18th	1966 by-election	Billy Kenneally (FF)	Fad Browne (FF)	Thomas Kyne (Lab)	3 seats 1961–1977
19th	1969	Billy Kenneally (FF)	Fad Browne (FF)	Edward Collins (FG)	3 seats 1961–1977
20th	1973	Billy Kenneally (FF)	Thomas Kyne (Lab)	Edward Collins (FG)	3 seats 1961–1977
21st	1977	Billy Kenneally (FF)	Jackie Fahey (FF)	Edward Collins (FG)	Austin Deasy (FG)
22nd	1981	Billy Kenneally (FF)	Jackie Fahey (FF)	Edward Collins (FG)	Austin Deasy (FG)
23rd	1982 (Feb)	Paddy Gallagher (SF–WP)	Jackie Fahey (FF)	Edward Collins (FG)	Austin Deasy (FG)
24th	1982 (Nov)	Donal Ormonde (FF)	Jackie Fahey (FF)	Edward Collins (FG)	Austin Deasy (FG)
25th	1987	Martin Cullen (PDs)	Jackie Fahey (FF)	Brian Swift (FF)	Austin Deasy (FG)
26th	1989	Brian O'Shea (Lab)	Jackie Fahey (FF)	Brendan Kenneally (FF)	Austin Deasy (FG)
27th	1992	Brian O'Shea (Lab)	Martin Cullen (PDs)	Brendan Kenneally (FF)	Austin Deasy (FG)
28th	1997	Brian O'Shea (Lab)	Martin Cullen (FF)	Brendan Kenneally (FF)	Austin Deasy (FG)
29th	2002	Brian O'Shea (Lab)	Martin Cullen (FF)	Ollie Wilkinson (FF)	John Deasy (FG)
30th	2007	Brian O'Shea (Lab)	Martin Cullen (FF)	Brendan Kenneally (FF)	John Deasy (FG)
31st	2011	Ciara Conway (Lab)	John Halligan (Ind.)	Paudie Coffey (FG)	John Deasy (FG)
32nd	2016	David Cullinane (SF)	John Halligan (Ind.)	Mary Butler (FF)	John Deasy (FG)
33rd	2020	David Cullinane (SF)	Marc Ó Cathasaigh (GP)	Mary Butler (FF)	Matt Shanahan (Ind.)
34th	2024	David Cullinane (SF)	Conor D. McGuinness (SF)	Mary Butler (FF)	John Cummins (FG)
