= Patrick Gallagher (politician) =

Irish former politician (born 1946)

Teachta Dála
- In office June 1977 – June 1981
- Constituency: Waterford

Personal details
- Born: 1 December 1946 (age 79) Waterford, Ireland
- Party: Fianna Fáil

Patrick Gallagher (born 1 December 1946) is an Irish former politician. He was a member of Sinn Féin the Workers Party, the Workers' Party and Democratic Left political parties. He was elected to Dáil Éireann as a Sinn Féin the Workers Party Teachta Dála (TD) for the Waterford constituency at the February 1982 general election. He lost his seat at the November 1982 general election. He was an elected member of Waterford City Council from the 1970s to 1990s.

A journalist, Gallagher established his own free-sheet newspaper Waterford Today.

Dáil	Election	Deputy (Party)	Deputy (Party)	Deputy (Party)	Deputy (Party)
4th	1923	Caitlín Brugha (Rep)	John Butler (Lab)	Nicholas Wall (FP)	William Redmond (NL)
5th	1927 (Jun)	Caitlín Brugha (Rep)	Patrick Little (FF)	Vincent White (CnaG)	William Redmond (NL)
6th	1927 (Sep)	Seán Goulding (FF)	Patrick Little (FF)	Vincent White (CnaG)	William Redmond (NL)
7th	1932	Seán Goulding (FF)	Patrick Little (FF)	John Kiersey (CnaG)	William Redmond (CnaG)
8th	1933	Seán Goulding (FF)	Patrick Little (FF)	Nicholas Wall (NCP)	Bridget Redmond (CnaG)
9th	1937	Michael Morrissey (FF)	Patrick Little (FF)	Nicholas Wall (FG)	Bridget Redmond (FG)
10th	1938	Michael Morrissey (FF)	Patrick Little (FF)	William Broderick (FG)	Bridget Redmond (FG)
11th	1943	Michael Morrissey (FF)	Patrick Little (FF)	Denis Heskin (CnaT)	Bridget Redmond (FG)
12th	1944	Michael Morrissey (FF)	Patrick Little (FF)	Denis Heskin (CnaT)	Bridget Redmond (FG)
12th	1947 by-election	John Ormonde (FF)	Patrick Little (FF)	Denis Heskin (CnaT)	Bridget Redmond (FG)
13th	1948	John Ormonde (FF)	Patrick Little (FF)	Thomas Kyne (Lab)	Bridget Redmond (FG)
14th	1951	John Ormonde (FF)	Patrick Little (FF)	Thomas Kyne (Lab)	Bridget Redmond (FG)
14th	1952 by-election	John Ormonde (FF)	Patrick Little (FF)	Thomas Kyne (Lab)	William Kenneally (FF)
15th	1954	John Ormonde (FF)	Thaddeus Lynch (FG)	Thomas Kyne (Lab)	William Kenneally (FF)
16th	1957	John Ormonde (FF)	Thaddeus Lynch (FG)	Thomas Kyne (Lab)	William Kenneally (FF)
17th	1961	John Ormonde (FF)	Thaddeus Lynch (FG)	Thomas Kyne (Lab)	3 seats 1961–1977
18th	1965	Billy Kenneally (FF)	Thaddeus Lynch (FG)	Thomas Kyne (Lab)	3 seats 1961–1977
18th	1966 by-election	Billy Kenneally (FF)	Fad Browne (FF)	Thomas Kyne (Lab)	3 seats 1961–1977
19th	1969	Billy Kenneally (FF)	Fad Browne (FF)	Edward Collins (FG)	3 seats 1961–1977
20th	1973	Billy Kenneally (FF)	Thomas Kyne (Lab)	Edward Collins (FG)	3 seats 1961–1977
21st	1977	Billy Kenneally (FF)	Jackie Fahey (FF)	Edward Collins (FG)	Austin Deasy (FG)
22nd	1981	Billy Kenneally (FF)	Jackie Fahey (FF)	Edward Collins (FG)	Austin Deasy (FG)
23rd	1982 (Feb)	Paddy Gallagher (SF–WP)	Jackie Fahey (FF)	Edward Collins (FG)	Austin Deasy (FG)
24th	1982 (Nov)	Donal Ormonde (FF)	Jackie Fahey (FF)	Edward Collins (FG)	Austin Deasy (FG)
25th	1987	Martin Cullen (PDs)	Jackie Fahey (FF)	Brian Swift (FF)	Austin Deasy (FG)
26th	1989	Brian O'Shea (Lab)	Jackie Fahey (FF)	Brendan Kenneally (FF)	Austin Deasy (FG)
27th	1992	Brian O'Shea (Lab)	Martin Cullen (PDs)	Brendan Kenneally (FF)	Austin Deasy (FG)
28th	1997	Brian O'Shea (Lab)	Martin Cullen (FF)	Brendan Kenneally (FF)	Austin Deasy (FG)
29th	2002	Brian O'Shea (Lab)	Martin Cullen (FF)	Ollie Wilkinson (FF)	John Deasy (FG)
30th	2007	Brian O'Shea (Lab)	Martin Cullen (FF)	Brendan Kenneally (FF)	John Deasy (FG)
31st	2011	Ciara Conway (Lab)	John Halligan (Ind.)	Paudie Coffey (FG)	John Deasy (FG)
32nd	2016	David Cullinane (SF)	John Halligan (Ind.)	Mary Butler (FF)	John Deasy (FG)
33rd	2020	David Cullinane (SF)	Marc Ó Cathasaigh (GP)	Mary Butler (FF)	Matt Shanahan (Ind.)
34th	2024	David Cullinane (SF)	Conor D. McGuinness (SF)	Mary Butler (FF)	John Cummins (FG)
