= Bridget Redmond =

Irish politician (1904–1952)

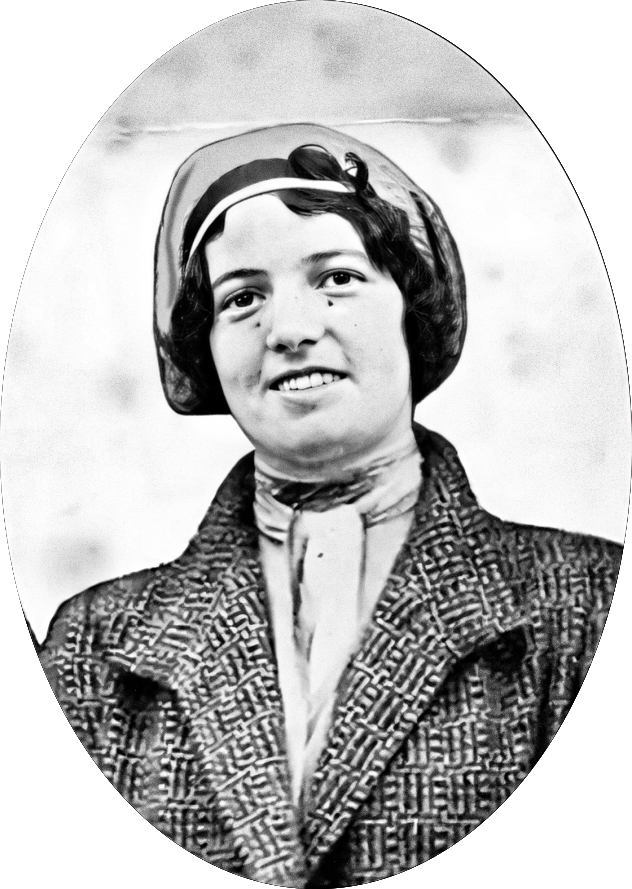
- Redmond, c. 1930s

Teachta Dála
- In office January 1933 – 3 May 1952
- Constituency: Waterford

Personal details
- Born: Bridget Mary Mallick; 30 October 1904 Curragh, County Kildare, Ireland
- Died: 3 May 1952 (aged 47) Athgarvan, near Newbridge, County Kildare
- Party: Cumann na nGaedheal; Fine Gael
- Spouse: William Redmond
- Education: Ursuline school, Waterford
- Nickname: Tiny

Bridget Mary Redmond (née Mallick; 30 October 1904 – 3 May 1952) was an Irish Cumann na nGaedheal and Fine Gael politician, as well as a member of Eoin O'Duffy's radical Blueshirts paramilitary. Thrust into politics by the sudden death of her husband in 1932, Redmond would go on to have a twenty-year career in Irish politics during a period in which it was extremely rare for women to hold public office.

== Early life ==
Bridget Mary Mallick was born to John Mallick, landowner, hotelier, and racehorse owner, and Bridget Mallick (née Sex), both of the Curragh in County Kildare. Growing up, she studied at an Ursuline school in Waterford City between 1916 and 1922, where she earned the nickname "Tiny" due to her small stature. The nickname would stick with her for the rest of her life, with family, friends and supporters all using the moniker. A talented singer and sportswoman, she lived the typical life of the daughter of wealthy landowners until her marriage to Captain William Redmond on 18 November 1930. The only son of one of the most well-known politicians in Ireland in that era, John Redmond, William was introduced to Bridget by mutual friends. Despite an eighteen-year age gap between the two, she was reportedly devoted to William. William, who had served with the British Army during World War I, successfully followed his recently deceased father into politics immediately afterwards. She would always accompany William during his elections and his constituency work, unknowingly acquiring knowledge she'd soon need.

== Political career ==
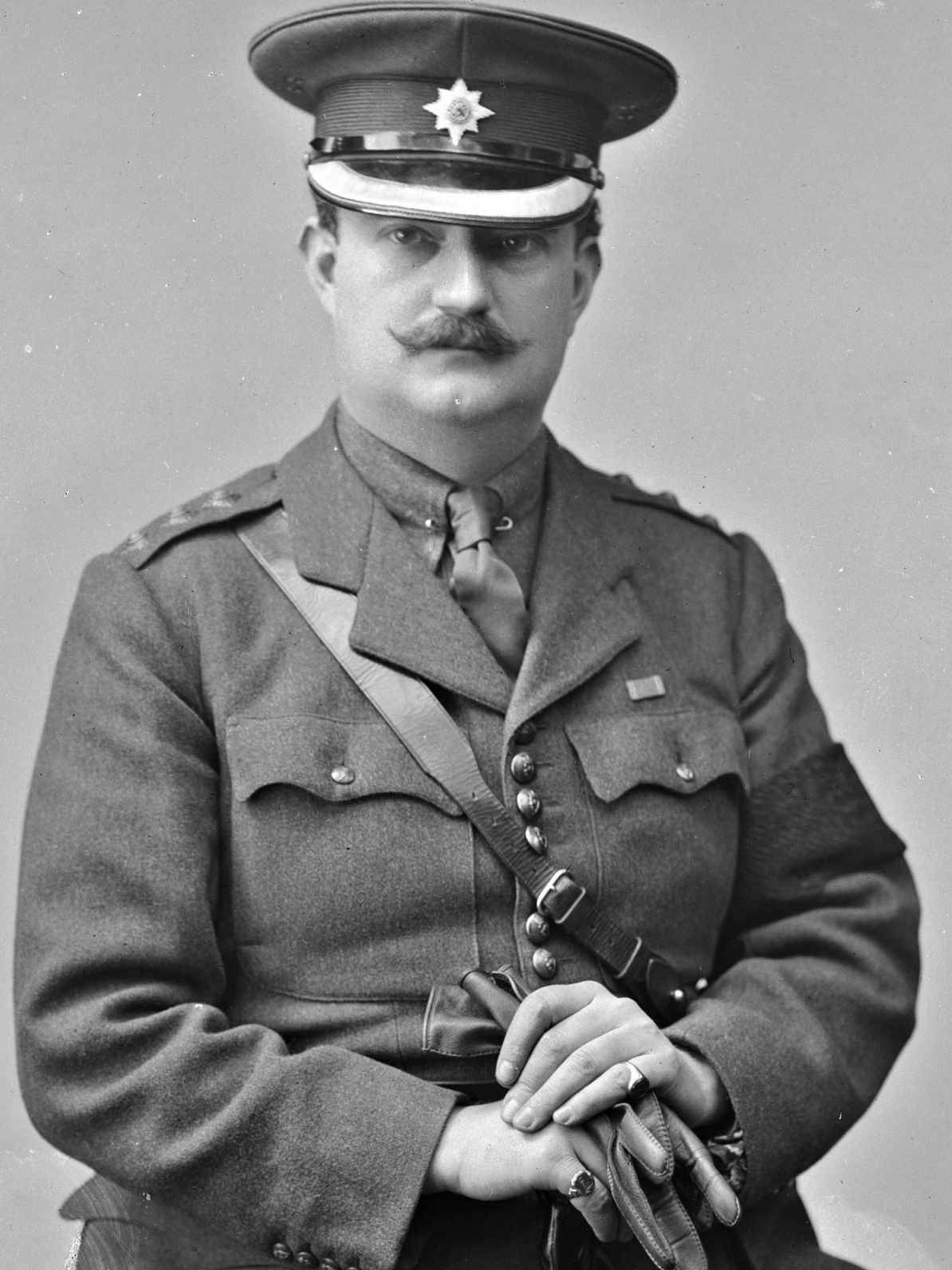
William Redmond, seen here in c. 1918 in his army uniform

Less than two years into their marriage, William died suddenly on 17 April 1932. When William entered politics, his supporters (particularly in Waterford City), looked to him to carry forward the legacy of his father. William had largely succeeded in this, for example in the 1918 general election, William was one of only two candidates for the Irish Parliamentary Party to win a seat in the south of Ireland amidst the tidal wave surge of Sinn Féin. From the Redmondite base in Waterford City, William kept the thread of the Irish Parliamentary Party alive via the National League Party during the 1920s. However, that party was disbanded in the late 1920s and from there, William joined Cumann na nGaedheal in 1931.

Following William's death, Cumann na nGaedheal were anxious to retain the newly acquired Redmond legacy and the deep-rooted support it retained. The party turned to Bridget and asked her to stand in the 1933 general election (As a general election was already approaching, a by-election was not called). To the surprise of those around her, she agreed.

Once again confirming the power of the Redmond name in Waterford City, she was elected to Dáil Éireann as a Cumann na nGaedheal Teachta Dála (TD) for the Waterford constituency at the 1933 general election. It would be the beginning of a 20-year career in the Dáil as she was re-elected at every subsequent election until her death in 1952. Over the course of her career, she would increase her share of the vote in every single election she fought.

Despite being thrown into politics on a mandate of continuing the moderate politics associated with John and William Redmond, she instead threw herself into the radical right-wing politics of Eoin O'Duffy and the Blueshirts, who at that moment in time were fighting on behalf of Cumann na nGaedheal in a proxy battle with the Irish Republican Army, themselves fighting on behalf of Fianna Fáil. The Blueshirts, Cumann na nGaedhael and the National Centre Party merged in 1933 to form Fine Gael. In 1933 Redmond publicly expressed the view that a thirty-two-county republic was impossible, and accused the Government of driving the two sections of Ireland further apart. Redmond declared that she would never stand for a twenty-six county republic as there were as many men in the North who were just as good nationalists as those in the south and they should not be ignored. She also chastised Éamon de Valera for his tolerance of the actions of the IRA.

Over the course of her career in the Dáil, Redmond was most active when commentating on legislation affecting housing and social conditions. Other areas she was involved with were education, the place of women in the 1937 constitution and on the declaration of an Irish republic in 1948.

Redmond died on 3 May 1952 at her mother's residence in Athgarvan, near Newbridge, County Kildare. She was 47 at the time and had been ill for a number of weeks. Her death brought an end to sixty-one years of parliamentary representation in Waterford by the Redmond family.

== See also ==
- Families in the Oireachtas

Dáil	Election	Deputy (Party)	Deputy (Party)	Deputy (Party)	Deputy (Party)
4th	1923	Caitlín Brugha (Rep)	John Butler (Lab)	Nicholas Wall (FP)	William Redmond (NL)
5th	1927 (Jun)	Caitlín Brugha (Rep)	Patrick Little (FF)	Vincent White (CnaG)	William Redmond (NL)
6th	1927 (Sep)	Seán Goulding (FF)	Patrick Little (FF)	Vincent White (CnaG)	William Redmond (NL)
7th	1932	Seán Goulding (FF)	Patrick Little (FF)	John Kiersey (CnaG)	William Redmond (CnaG)
8th	1933	Seán Goulding (FF)	Patrick Little (FF)	Nicholas Wall (NCP)	Bridget Redmond (CnaG)
9th	1937	Michael Morrissey (FF)	Patrick Little (FF)	Nicholas Wall (FG)	Bridget Redmond (FG)
10th	1938	Michael Morrissey (FF)	Patrick Little (FF)	William Broderick (FG)	Bridget Redmond (FG)
11th	1943	Michael Morrissey (FF)	Patrick Little (FF)	Denis Heskin (CnaT)	Bridget Redmond (FG)
12th	1944	Michael Morrissey (FF)	Patrick Little (FF)	Denis Heskin (CnaT)	Bridget Redmond (FG)
12th	1947 by-election	John Ormonde (FF)	Patrick Little (FF)	Denis Heskin (CnaT)	Bridget Redmond (FG)
13th	1948	John Ormonde (FF)	Patrick Little (FF)	Thomas Kyne (Lab)	Bridget Redmond (FG)
14th	1951	John Ormonde (FF)	Patrick Little (FF)	Thomas Kyne (Lab)	Bridget Redmond (FG)
14th	1952 by-election	John Ormonde (FF)	Patrick Little (FF)	Thomas Kyne (Lab)	William Kenneally (FF)
15th	1954	John Ormonde (FF)	Thaddeus Lynch (FG)	Thomas Kyne (Lab)	William Kenneally (FF)
16th	1957	John Ormonde (FF)	Thaddeus Lynch (FG)	Thomas Kyne (Lab)	William Kenneally (FF)
17th	1961	John Ormonde (FF)	Thaddeus Lynch (FG)	Thomas Kyne (Lab)	3 seats 1961–1977
18th	1965	Billy Kenneally (FF)	Thaddeus Lynch (FG)	Thomas Kyne (Lab)	3 seats 1961–1977
18th	1966 by-election	Billy Kenneally (FF)	Fad Browne (FF)	Thomas Kyne (Lab)	3 seats 1961–1977
19th	1969	Billy Kenneally (FF)	Fad Browne (FF)	Edward Collins (FG)	3 seats 1961–1977
20th	1973	Billy Kenneally (FF)	Thomas Kyne (Lab)	Edward Collins (FG)	3 seats 1961–1977
21st	1977	Billy Kenneally (FF)	Jackie Fahey (FF)	Edward Collins (FG)	Austin Deasy (FG)
22nd	1981	Billy Kenneally (FF)	Jackie Fahey (FF)	Edward Collins (FG)	Austin Deasy (FG)
23rd	1982 (Feb)	Paddy Gallagher (SF–WP)	Jackie Fahey (FF)	Edward Collins (FG)	Austin Deasy (FG)
24th	1982 (Nov)	Donal Ormonde (FF)	Jackie Fahey (FF)	Edward Collins (FG)	Austin Deasy (FG)
25th	1987	Martin Cullen (PDs)	Jackie Fahey (FF)	Brian Swift (FF)	Austin Deasy (FG)
26th	1989	Brian O'Shea (Lab)	Jackie Fahey (FF)	Brendan Kenneally (FF)	Austin Deasy (FG)
27th	1992	Brian O'Shea (Lab)	Martin Cullen (PDs)	Brendan Kenneally (FF)	Austin Deasy (FG)
28th	1997	Brian O'Shea (Lab)	Martin Cullen (FF)	Brendan Kenneally (FF)	Austin Deasy (FG)
29th	2002	Brian O'Shea (Lab)	Martin Cullen (FF)	Ollie Wilkinson (FF)	John Deasy (FG)
30th	2007	Brian O'Shea (Lab)	Martin Cullen (FF)	Brendan Kenneally (FF)	John Deasy (FG)
31st	2011	Ciara Conway (Lab)	John Halligan (Ind.)	Paudie Coffey (FG)	John Deasy (FG)
32nd	2016	David Cullinane (SF)	John Halligan (Ind.)	Mary Butler (FF)	John Deasy (FG)
33rd	2020	David Cullinane (SF)	Marc Ó Cathasaigh (GP)	Mary Butler (FF)	Matt Shanahan (Ind.)
34th	2024	David Cullinane (SF)	Conor D. McGuinness (SF)	Mary Butler (FF)	John Cummins (FG)
