= Paudie Coffey =

Irish politician (born 1969)

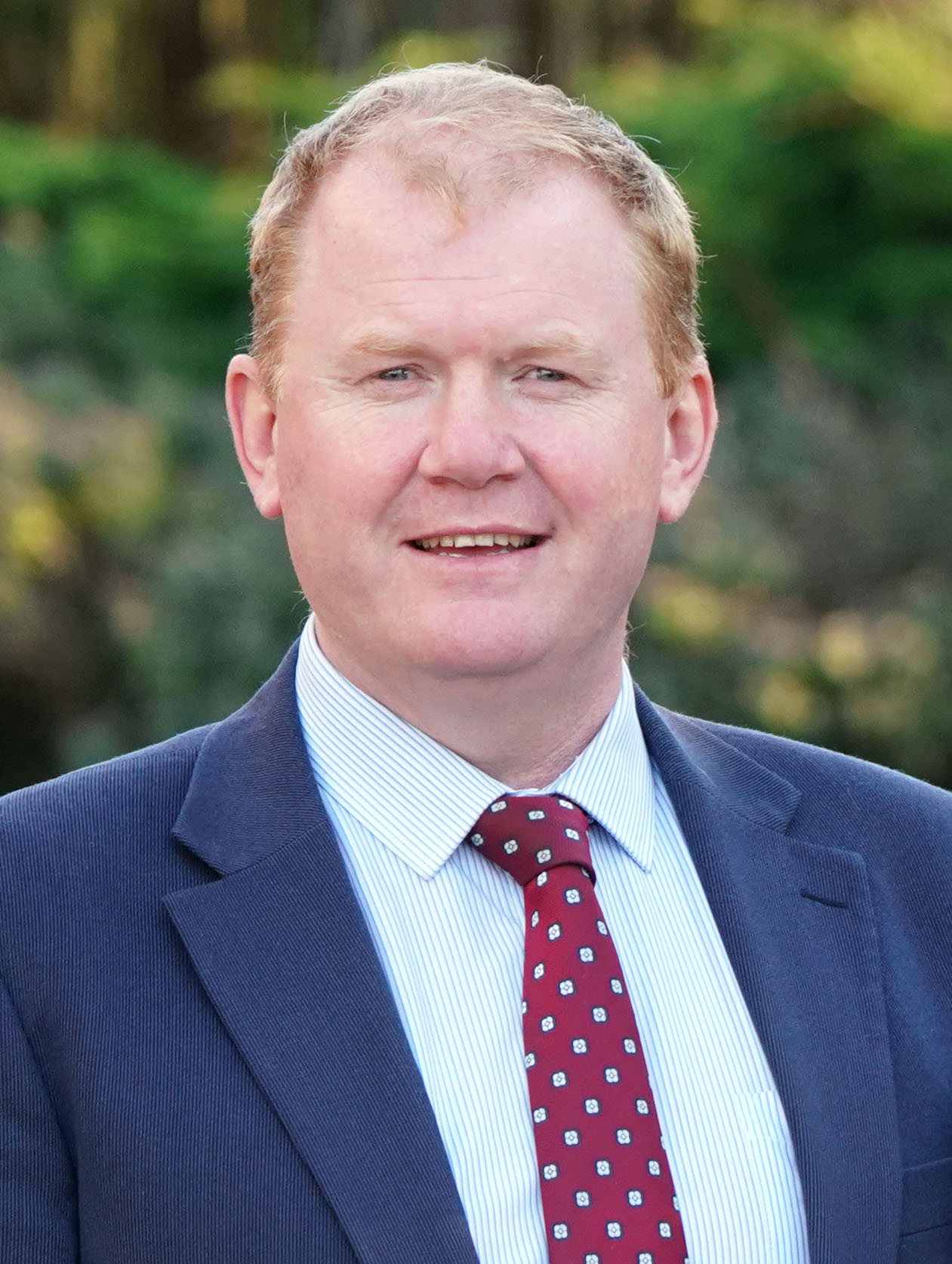

Minister of State
- 2014–2016: Environment, Community and Local Government

Senator
- In office 8 June 2016 – 29 June 2020
- Constituency: Nominated by the Taoiseach
- In office 13 September 2007 – 25 February 2011
- Constituency: Industrial and Commercial Panel

Teachta Dála
- In office February 2011 – February 2016
- Constituency: Waterford

Personal details
- Born: 15 May 1969 (age 57) Waterford, Ireland
- Party: Fine Gael
- Children: 3
- Education: Waterford Institute of Technology; University College Dublin

Paudie Coffey (born 15 May 1969) is an Irish former Fine Gael politician who served as a Minister of State from 2014 to 2016. He served as a Senator from 2016 to 2020, after being nominated by the Taoiseach, and previously from 2007 to 2011 for the Industrial and Commercial Panel. He was a Teachta Dála (TD) for the Waterford constituency from 2011 to 2016.

== Political career ==
He was first elected to Waterford County Council in 1999 for the Suir local electoral area, and re-elected in 2004. He was an unsuccessful candidate at the 2007 general election for the Waterford constituency, but was subsequently elected to Seanad Éireann in July 2007 as a Senator for the Industrial and Commercial Panel.

Coffey was elected for the Waterford constituency at the 2011 general election gaining 9,698 (18.1%) first preference votes and was subsequently elected. On 15 July 2014, he was appointed as Minister of State at the Department of the Environment, Community and Local Government with responsibility for Housing, Planning and Co-ordination of the Construction 2020 Strategy. He lost his seat at the 2016 general election.

Coffey was instrumental in the introduction of the Construction Contracts Act 2013. The Act regularises payment terms between construction companies, and puts in place a dispute resolution process aimed at reducing days lost and costs on construction projects.

He was nominated by the Taoiseach Enda Kenny to the 25th Seanad in May 2016.

== Kilkenny People court case ==
Coffey alleged he was defamed by the Kilkenny People newspaper on 15 January 2016. He was nicknamed 'Coffey the Robber' after the newspaper published an article containing a press release by Carlow-Kilkenny Fine Gael TD John Paul Phelan. The comparison was based on William Crotty, who was an 18th-century criminal known as Crotty the Robber. Coffey settled out of court on 31 July 2019.

== Retirement ==
On 16 December 2019, he announced that he was retiring from politics and would not contest the next general election.

Dáil	Election	Deputy (Party)	Deputy (Party)	Deputy (Party)	Deputy (Party)
4th	1923	Caitlín Brugha (Rep)	John Butler (Lab)	Nicholas Wall (FP)	William Redmond (NL)
5th	1927 (Jun)	Caitlín Brugha (Rep)	Patrick Little (FF)	Vincent White (CnaG)	William Redmond (NL)
6th	1927 (Sep)	Seán Goulding (FF)	Patrick Little (FF)	Vincent White (CnaG)	William Redmond (NL)
7th	1932	Seán Goulding (FF)	Patrick Little (FF)	John Kiersey (CnaG)	William Redmond (CnaG)
8th	1933	Seán Goulding (FF)	Patrick Little (FF)	Nicholas Wall (NCP)	Bridget Redmond (CnaG)
9th	1937	Michael Morrissey (FF)	Patrick Little (FF)	Nicholas Wall (FG)	Bridget Redmond (FG)
10th	1938	Michael Morrissey (FF)	Patrick Little (FF)	William Broderick (FG)	Bridget Redmond (FG)
11th	1943	Michael Morrissey (FF)	Patrick Little (FF)	Denis Heskin (CnaT)	Bridget Redmond (FG)
12th	1944	Michael Morrissey (FF)	Patrick Little (FF)	Denis Heskin (CnaT)	Bridget Redmond (FG)
12th	1947 by-election	John Ormonde (FF)	Patrick Little (FF)	Denis Heskin (CnaT)	Bridget Redmond (FG)
13th	1948	John Ormonde (FF)	Patrick Little (FF)	Thomas Kyne (Lab)	Bridget Redmond (FG)
14th	1951	John Ormonde (FF)	Patrick Little (FF)	Thomas Kyne (Lab)	Bridget Redmond (FG)
14th	1952 by-election	John Ormonde (FF)	Patrick Little (FF)	Thomas Kyne (Lab)	William Kenneally (FF)
15th	1954	John Ormonde (FF)	Thaddeus Lynch (FG)	Thomas Kyne (Lab)	William Kenneally (FF)
16th	1957	John Ormonde (FF)	Thaddeus Lynch (FG)	Thomas Kyne (Lab)	William Kenneally (FF)
17th	1961	John Ormonde (FF)	Thaddeus Lynch (FG)	Thomas Kyne (Lab)	3 seats 1961–1977
18th	1965	Billy Kenneally (FF)	Thaddeus Lynch (FG)	Thomas Kyne (Lab)	3 seats 1961–1977
18th	1966 by-election	Billy Kenneally (FF)	Fad Browne (FF)	Thomas Kyne (Lab)	3 seats 1961–1977
19th	1969	Billy Kenneally (FF)	Fad Browne (FF)	Edward Collins (FG)	3 seats 1961–1977
20th	1973	Billy Kenneally (FF)	Thomas Kyne (Lab)	Edward Collins (FG)	3 seats 1961–1977
21st	1977	Billy Kenneally (FF)	Jackie Fahey (FF)	Edward Collins (FG)	Austin Deasy (FG)
22nd	1981	Billy Kenneally (FF)	Jackie Fahey (FF)	Edward Collins (FG)	Austin Deasy (FG)
23rd	1982 (Feb)	Paddy Gallagher (SF–WP)	Jackie Fahey (FF)	Edward Collins (FG)	Austin Deasy (FG)
24th	1982 (Nov)	Donal Ormonde (FF)	Jackie Fahey (FF)	Edward Collins (FG)	Austin Deasy (FG)
25th	1987	Martin Cullen (PDs)	Jackie Fahey (FF)	Brian Swift (FF)	Austin Deasy (FG)
26th	1989	Brian O'Shea (Lab)	Jackie Fahey (FF)	Brendan Kenneally (FF)	Austin Deasy (FG)
27th	1992	Brian O'Shea (Lab)	Martin Cullen (PDs)	Brendan Kenneally (FF)	Austin Deasy (FG)
28th	1997	Brian O'Shea (Lab)	Martin Cullen (FF)	Brendan Kenneally (FF)	Austin Deasy (FG)
29th	2002	Brian O'Shea (Lab)	Martin Cullen (FF)	Ollie Wilkinson (FF)	John Deasy (FG)
30th	2007	Brian O'Shea (Lab)	Martin Cullen (FF)	Brendan Kenneally (FF)	John Deasy (FG)
31st	2011	Ciara Conway (Lab)	John Halligan (Ind.)	Paudie Coffey (FG)	John Deasy (FG)
32nd	2016	David Cullinane (SF)	John Halligan (Ind.)	Mary Butler (FF)	John Deasy (FG)
33rd	2020	David Cullinane (SF)	Marc Ó Cathasaigh (GP)	Mary Butler (FF)	Matt Shanahan (Ind.)
34th	2024	David Cullinane (SF)	Conor D. McGuinness (SF)	Mary Butler (FF)	John Cummins (FG)
