= 2014 Waterford City and County Council election =

Part of the 2014 Irish local elections

← 2009 City & 2009 County	23 May 2014	2019 →

All 32 seats on Waterford City and County Council 17 seats needed for a majority
	First party	Second party	Third party
Party	Fine Gael	Fianna Fáil	Sinn Féin
Seats won	8	8	6
	Fourth party	Fifth party
Party	Labour	Independent
Seats won	1	9
- Area of Waterford City and County Council

An election to all 32 seats on Waterford City and County Council took place on 23 May 2014 as part of the 2014 Irish local elections. The City and County of Waterford was divided into five local electoral areas (LEAs) to elect councillors for a five-year term of office on the system of proportional representation by means of the single transferable vote (PR-STV). This was a new local authority formed as a successor to both Waterford City Council (15 seats at the 2009 election) and Waterford County Council (23 seats at the 2009 election). The town councils of Dungarvan, Lismore and Tramore were also abolished.

Although it was behind Fine Gael in first preference vote share, Fianna Fáil emerged as the joint largest party on the council after the elections winning 8 seats in all. The party secured 3 seats in Comeragh, 2 in Dungarvan–Lismore and 1 in each of the Waterford city LEAs where the party had been traditionally weak after 2004 and 2009. Fine Gael's best result was in Dungarvan-Lismore where the party returned 3 seats. As the results indicate several of the party's sitting councillors lost their seats across the City and County. It was also a poor election for Labour who were reduced to just 1 seat on the new council and no city representation. The Workers' Party lost its sole seat; the first time since 1974 where it had no representation in Waterford local politics. Sinn Féin had a very successful election increasing their numbers to 6 across the City and County and winning a seat in each LEA. Independents secured the remaining 9 seats.

== Results by party ==
Party	Seats	±	1st pref	FPv%	±%
Fine Gael	8		11,095	25.1	
Fianna Fáil	8		8,612	19.5	
Sinn Féin	6		7,090	16.0	
Labour	1		3,536	8.0	
People Before Profit	0		179	0.40	
Independent	9		12,100	27.3	
Total	32	▼6	44,248	100.0	—

== Results by local electoral area ==
*: Outgoing councillor.

=== Comeragh ===
Comeragh: 6 seats
Party	Candidate	FPv%	Count								
Party	Candidate	FPv%	1	2	3	4	5	6	7	8	9
Fianna Fáil	Michael J. O'Ryan	16.4%	1,484								
Fine Gael	Liam Brazil	16.0%	1,445								
Fianna Fáil	John O'Leary	11.1%	1,002	1,040	1,054	1,065	1,084	1,129	1,245	1,297	
Sinn Féin	Declan Clune	10.8%	974	987	995	1,013	1,041	1,147	1,211	1,386	
Fine Gael	Seanie Power	10.1%	907	954	984	1,000	1,127	1,198	1,245	1,275	1,281
Fianna Fáil	Mary Butler	7.1%	639	677	689	706	730	775	868	989	1,037
Fine Gael	Brendan Coffey	6.4%	577	584	627	645	658	688	799	895	918
Independent	Seanie Walsh	5.4%	491	494	496	525	596	683	736		
Labour	Ger Barron	5.4%	484	487	514	557	563	615			
Direct Democracy	Dr. David James	5.3%	474	505	510	539	562				
Independent	Michael Flynn	3.4%	311	321	325	360					
Independent	Dermot Kirwan	2.7%	240	243	254						
Electorate: 15,534 Valid: 9,028 Spoilt: 97 Quota: 1,290 Turnout: 9,125 (58.7%)

=== Dungarvan–Lismore ===
Dungarvan–Lismore: 8 seats
Party	Candidate	FPv%	Count							
Party	Candidate	FPv%	1	2	3	4	5	6	7	8
Fine Gael	Damien Geoghegan	11.3%	1,337							
Fine Gael	Pat Nugent	10.6%	1,252	1,277	1,310	1,315				
Fianna Fáil	James Tobin	9.9%	1,171	1,177	1,281	1,282	1,315			
Sinn Féin	Siobhán Whelan	8.9%	1,048	1,109	1,159	1,162	1,218	1,245	1,729	
Labour	John Pratt	8.8%	1,040	1,053	1,069	1,070	1,113	1,159	1,222	1,271
Fianna Fáil	Tom Cronin	7.8%	920	936	1,041	1,042	1,098	1,167	1,203	1,240
Fine Gael	Declan Doocey	6.9%	823	829	841	842	872	1,113	1,166	1,200
Independent	Seamus O'Donnell	5.9%	704	771	800	801	995	1,041	1,096	1,197
Sinn Féin	Louise Brierley	5.9%	697	714	723	724	773	790		
Labour	Nicky Sheehan	5.6%	666	733	826	832	855	990	1,004	1,026
Fine Gael	Micheál Cosgrave	5.3%	628	644	686	690	725			
Independent	Midí de Paor Walsh	5.0%	592	623	648	649				
Fianna Fáil	Ann Marie Rossiter	4.6%	537	566						
Independent	Michael Wright	3.3%	392							
Electorate: 22,774 Valid: 11,807 Spoilt: 148 Quota: 1,312 Turnout: 11,955 (52.5%)

=== Tramore–Waterford City West ===
Tramore–Waterford City West: 6 seats
Party	Candidate	FPv%	Count											
Party	Candidate	FPv%	1	2	3	4	5	6	7	8	9	10	11	12
Independent	Joe Conway	11.5%	960	966	977	1,018	1,124	1,136	1,176	1,230				
Independent	Joe Kelly	8.6%	716	732	753	755	765	840	891	900	901	978	1,042	1,155
Independent	Blaise Hannigan	7.9%	664	666	675	706	777	801	822	867	877	919	949	995
Sinn Féin	Jim Griffin	7.5%	631	649	661	672	686	718	738	775	779	848	1,212	
Independent	Ann Marie Power	7.5%	623	633	647	696	736	750	792	818	824	856	871	903
Fine Gael	Lola O'Sullivan	6.9%	577	580	582	694	730	733	792	857	864	883	895	1,143
Fine Gael	Hilary Quinlan	6.8%	566	571	577	598	605	638	705	734	736	783	801	
Fianna Fáil	Pat Daly	6.0%	505	505	506	517	526	530	538					
Fianna Fáil	Eamon Quinlan	6.0%	504	507	517	523	547	564	601	795	799	843	876	983
Sinn Féin	David Lane	5.6%	472	476	486	492	499	540	555	567	567	666		
Workers' Party	Davy Walsh	4.9%	409	432	437	442	445	509	551	567	567			
Labour	Dee Jacques	4.7%	392	404	416	431	445	473						
Independent	Pat Finnerty	4.3%	359	361	365	380								
Independent	Dick Roche	4.1%	346	365	384	385	391							
Fine Gael	Maxine Keoghan	4.1%	341	348	350									
Independent	Jenna Keane	1.7%	145	157										
Independent	Monica Melay	1.2%	103											
Workers' Party	Brian Hearne	0.7%	55											
Electorate: 16,028 Valid: 8,368 Spoilt: 130 Quota: 1,196 Turnout: 8,498 (53%)

=== Waterford City East ===
Waterford City East: 6 seats
Party	Candidate	FPv%	Count											
Party	Candidate	FPv%	1	2	3	4	5	6	7	8	9	10	11	12
Sinn Féin	Pat Fitzgerald	15.6%	1,221											
Independent	Davy Daniels	14.4%	1,130											
Fine Gael	John Carey	11.1%	869	888	892	895	923	925	941	975	976	1,109	1,138	
Fianna Fáil	Adam Wyse	9.4%	732	745	751	761	822	834	971	1,028	1,030	1,084	1,165	
Independent	Mary Roche	8.5%	668	680	694	731	740	792	834	949	952	1,025	1,167	
Independent	Eddie Mulligan	7.7%	601	614	632	650	660	690	712	743	745	798	925	958
Fine Gael	Jim D'Arcy	6.5%	509	512	515	526	527	534	544	608	610	777	831	847
Independent	Neil White	5.1%	405	411	418	440	447	493	512	550	551	569		
Fine Gael	Tom Cunningham	6.1%	484	484	487	489	494	497	509	545	546			
Labour	Jack Walsh	3.3%	376	380	384	390	391	406	423					
Fianna Fáil	Liz Murphy	3.1%	241	245	247	251	304	312						
Fianna Fáil	Eamon McGrath	2.3%	181	185	185	190								
People Before Profit	Joan Quirke	2.3%	179	195	211	220	222							
Independent	John Walsh	1.8%	141	143	149									
Direct Democracy	Larry McCarthy	1.1%	81	91										
Electorate: 19,090 Valid: 7,824 Spoilt: 94 Quota: 1,118 Turnout: 7,918 (41.5%)

=== Waterford City South ===
Waterford City South: 6 seats
Party	Candidate	FPv%	Count									
Party	Candidate	FPv%	1	2	3	4	5	6	7	8	9	10
Sinn Féin	John Hearne	18.7%	1,347									
Fine Gael	John Cummins	10.8%	780	788	797	802	807	824	862	908	911	1,089
Sinn Féin	Breda Brennan	9.7%	700	871	877	902	932	970	1,028	1,085		
Fianna Fáil	Jason Murphy	9.6%	696	712	719	721	725	737	763	827	833	889
Independent	Seán Reinhardt	8.8%	637	671	683	692	722	761	811	882	887	972
Independent	Laurence (Cha) O'Neill	8.5%	615	625	630	637	654	699	753	875	881	1,005
Labour	Seamus Ryan	8.0%	578	587	591	593	603	618	636	659	661	
Workers' Party	Willy Moore	6.9%	500	530	535	549	576	593	618	700	709	792
Independent	Tom Murphy	6.5%	467	477	481	485	499	535	591			
Independent	Donal Barry	4.3%	308	316	317	326	344	370				
Independent	David O'Brien	3.3%	237	244	247	256	281					
Independent	Keith Nolan	2.4%	175	183	187	199						
Direct Democracy	Gary Hogan	1.5%	111	114	114							
Independent	Eddie Walsh	1.0%	70	71								
Electorate: 12,181 Valid: 7,221 Spoilt: 139 Quota: 1,032 Turnout: 7,360 (59.3%)

== Changes ==
=== Co-options ===
Party	Outgoing	LEA	Reason	Date	Co-optee
Fianna Fáil	Mary Butler	Comeragh	Elected to the 32nd Dáil at the 2016 general election.	15 March 2016	Ray Murphy
Fine Gael	John Carey	Waterford City East	Death.	8 November 2018	Sharon Carey
Independent	Mary Roche	Waterford City East	Resigned due to personal reasons.	30 November 2018	Matt Shanahan

=== Changes in affiliation ===
Name	LEA	Elected as	New affiliation	Date
Eddie Mulligan	Waterford City East	Independent	Fianna Fáil	12 November 2014
