= 2024 Waterford City and County Council election =

Part of the 2024 Irish local elections

← 2019	7 June 2024	2029 →

All 32 seats on Waterford City and County Council 17 seats needed for a majority
	First party	Second party	Third party
Party	Fine Gael	Sinn Féin	Fianna Fáil
Seats won	8	7	5
Seat change	▲1	▲1	▼2
	Fourth party	Fifth party	Sixth party
Party	Labour	Social Democrats	Independent
Seats won	3	1	8
Seat change	▼1	▲1	▲2
	Seventh party
Party	Green
Seats won	0
Seat change	▼2
- Area of Waterford City and County Council

An election to all 32 seats on Waterford City and County Council was held on 7 June 2024 as part of the 2024 Irish local elections. Waterford City and County is divided into 6 local electoral areas (LEAs) to elect councillors for a five-year term of office on the electoral system of proportional representation by means of the single transferable vote (PR-STV).

== Retiring incumbents ==
The following councillors did not seek re-election:

Constituency	Departing Councillor	Party
Portlaw–Kilmacthomas	Ger Barron	Labour
Lismore	Mairéad Tobin	Fianna Fáil

== Results by party ==
Party	Candidates	Seats	±	1st pref	FPv%	±%
Fine Gael	11	8	▲1	11,085	23.89	▼1.12
Sinn Féin	18	7	▲1	9,832	21.19	▲7.11
Fianna Fáil	9	5	▼2	6,985	15.05	▼3.63
Labour	4	3	▼1	2,573	5.54	▼2.75
Green	5	0	▼2	1,655	3.57	▼2.45
Social Democrats	2	1	New	783	1.69	New
The Irish People	3	0	New	385	0.83	New
Rabharta	1	0	New	326	0.70	New
Aontú	1	0	Steady	275	0.59	▲0.03
Independent Ireland	1	0	New	151	0.33	New
People Before Profit	1	0	Steady	133	0.29	▼0.46
Party for Animal Welfare	1	0	New	81	0.17	New
Independent	22	8	▲2	12,142	26.16	▲0.12
Total	79	32	Steady	46,406	100.00	

== Results by LEA ==
*: Outgoing councillor elected in 2019.
†: Outgoing councillor coopted subsequent to the 2019 election.

=== Dungarvan ===
Dungarvan: 6 seats
Party	Candidate	FPv%	Count											
Party	Candidate	FPv%	1	2	3	4	5	6	7	8	9	10	11	12
Fine Gael	Damien Geoghegan	17.3%	1,584											
Sinn Féin	Conor D. McGuinness †	15.3%	1,408											
Fianna Fáil	Tom Cronin	13.4%	1,230	1,256	1,263	1,287	1,293	1,302	1,311					
Fine Gael	Pat Nugent	11.7%	1,073	1,134	1,137	1,155	1,157	1,181	1,199	1,246	1,293	1,318		
Labour	Thomas Phelan	8.6%	786	829	836	841	847	865	905	1,011	1,065	1,149	1,151	1,296
Independent	Joe O'Riordan	6.8%	627	651	657	667	688	709	763	804	891	971	973	1,044
Fine Gael	Monica Murphy	5.1%	468	510	513	518	522	528	540	614	637	667	669	
Independent	Seamus O'Donnell	5.0%	462	474	480	489	508	518	543	559	641	674	675	786
Green	Críostóir Ó Faoláin	3.8%	345	357	362	367	369	376	388					
Independent	Caren Hallahan	3.2%	295	308	311	322	357	370	406	427				
Independent	Jonathan Shaw	2.7%	244	264	267	270	287	294						
Sinn Féin	Siobhan Whelan	2.3%	209	218	234	235	238							
Sinn Féin	Fiona Regan	2.2%	204	210	246	252	257	362	403	442	466			
Independent	Aaron Joyce	1.4%	131	132	133	136								
Independent	Roger Morrison	0.8%	70	71	71									
Independent	Padraig Curran	0.4%	38	41	42									
Electorate: 17,625 Valid: 9,174 Spoilt: 85 Quota: 1,311 Turnout: 9,259 (52.53%)

=== Lismore ===
Lismore: 3 seats
Party	Candidate	FPv%	Count					
Party	Candidate	FPv%	1	2	3	4	5	6
Sinn Féin	Donnchadh Mulcahy	19.2%	988	1,025	1,065	1,134	1,178	1,208
Labour	John Pratt	18.6%	958	1,019	1,122	1,392		
Fine Gael	Niamh O'Donovan	15.5%	801	850	1,081	1,370		
Independent	Brian Buckley	15.2%	781	890	939	1,059	1,118	1,169
Fianna Fáil	Michael Walsh	14.1%	729	742	864			
Fine Gael	Declan Doocey	10.8%	559	569				
Green	Lynn Glasscoe	2.8%	145					
Independent	Frank Power	2.4%	126					
The Irish People	Michael McCarthy	1.3%	66					
Electorate: 9,952 Valid: 5,153 Spoilt: 51 Quota: 1,289 Turnout: 5,204 (52.29%)

=== Portlaw–Kilmacthomas ===
Portlaw–Kilmacthomas: 5 seats
Party	Candidate	FPv%	Count							
Party	Candidate	FPv%	1	2	3	4	5	6	7	8
Fine Gael	Liam Brazil	25.5%	1,982							
Fine Gael	Seanie Power	20.0%	1,554							
Fianna Fáil	John O’Leary	14.2%	1,104	1,411						
Independent	Declan Clune	11.5%	898	993	1,029	1,059	1,084	1,145	1,178	1,451
Sinn Féin	Catherine Burke	7.7%	600	688	709	716	731	894	1,107	1,169
Independent	Frank Conway	6.1%	474	521	542	581	592	608	631	842
Fianna Fáil	Ray Murphy	5.4%	423	520	640	644	697	716	770	
Sinn Féin	Ben Duggan	4.4%	342	355	365	368	371			
Sinn Féin	Thomas Guiry	4.1%	317	341	379	388	393	476		
The Irish People	Declan Power	1.2%	94	106	115					
Electorate: 15,401 Valid: 7,788 Spoilt: 73 Quota: 1,299 Turnout: 7,861 (51.04%)

=== Tramore–Waterford City West ===
Tramore–Waterford City West: 6 seats
Party	Candidate	FPv%	Count											
Party	Candidate	FPv%	1	2	3	4	5	6	7	8	9	10	11	12
Fine Gael	Lola O’Sullivan	16.0%	1,313											
Independent	Joe Kelly	13.0%	1,069	1,074	1,090	1,110	1,142	1,156	1,200					
Independent	Blaise Hannigan	11.2%	921	939	950	973	988	1,001	1,019	1,070	1,071	1,106	1,149	1,214
Independent	Joe Conway	10.6%	871	895	909	933	941	946	968	1,066	1,070	1,083	1,154	1,279
Sinn Féin	Jim Griffin	9.0%	739	744	752	756	770	865	871	879	881	1,074	1,116	1,153
Fianna Fáil	Eamon Quinlan	8.2%	676	697	702	707	745	753	839	880	891	894	925	1,035
Green	Cristiona Kiely	4.5%	373	389	396	399	428	432	465	480	483	496	568	
Rabharta	Killian Mangan	4.0%	326	331	346	350	371	384	394	408	409	423		
Sinn Féin	Suzie Duffin	3.9%	324	326	334	336	339	372	377	389	390			
Sinn Féin	Alannah Hutchinson-Smith	3.8%	316	317	323	326	342	386	400	409	410	498	569	627
Aontú	Ronan Cleary	3.3%	275	277	284	329	340	342	350					
Fine Gael	Richie Hayes	3.0%	245	267	275	282	303	317						
Sinn Féin	John Hayes	2.9%	240	249	251	254	263							
Labour	Mairead McKnight	2.9%	239	242	245	249								
Independent Ireland	Michael Gallwey	1.8%	151	154	174									
Party for Animal Welfare	Samantha Dooley	1.0%	81	82										
Independent	Melissa O'Neill	0.8%	69	69										
Electorate: 17,813 Valid: 8,228 Spoilt: 120 Quota: 1,176 Turnout: 8,348 (46.86%)

=== Waterford City East ===
Waterford City East: 6 seats
Party	Candidate	FPv%	Count									
Party	Candidate	FPv%	1	2	3	4	5	6	7	8	9	10
Independent	David Daniels	15.4%	1,331									
Independent	Declan Barry	14.5%	1,257									
Fianna Fáil	Adam Wyse	12.3%	1,062	1,080	1,103	1,121	1,124	1,172	1,429			
Fine Gael	Jim D'arcy	10.1%	872	882	898	904	907	937	997	1,062	1,067	1,257
Sinn Féin	Pat Fitzgerald	9.9%	856	885	891	1,075	1,078	1,302				
Social Democrats	Mary Roche	7.4%	643	650	659	676	678	721	788	825	847	1,126
Green	Jody Power	7.3%	630	641	649	663	667	673	714	755	768	
Independent	Darren Ryan	6.6%	572	635	649	654	655	726	765	792	816	934
Fianna Fáil	Stephanie Keating	5.4%	472	476	485	496	497	511				
Sinn Féin	Karl Cretzan	4.6%	401	410	416	493	495					
Sinn Féin	Caroline Griffin	3.9%	340	344	346							
The Irish People	John Walsh	2.6%	225									
Electorate: 17,379 Valid: 8,661 Spoilt: 90 Quota: 1,238 Turnout: 8,751 (50.35%)

=== Waterford City South ===
Waterford City South: 6 seats
Party	Candidate	FPv%	Count											
Party	Candidate	FPv%	1	2	3	4	5	6	7	8	9	10	11	12
Independent	Donal Barry	17.4%	1,291											
Sinn Féin	John Hearne	13.9%	1,030	1,065										
Fianna Fáil	Jason Murphy	12.8%	946	968	970	971	975	989	997	1,008	1,018	1,165		
Sinn Féin	Joeanne Bailey	9.6%	712	729	730	731	740	750	767	778	941	978	983	1,039
Fine Gael	Frank Quinlan	8.6%	634	653	654	654	657	681	695	707	717	762	800	855
Labour	Seamus Ryan	8.0%	590	610	610	611	623	656	723	740	752	783	810	931
Sinn Féin	Kevin Burke	7.0%	520	532	532	533	544	548	565	569	660	698	702	762
Fianna Fáil	Vivienne Burns	4.6%	343	361	361	362	375	387	395	410	419			
Independent	Seán Reinhardt	4.6%	343	372	402	404	419	428	438	540	555	587	599	
Sinn Féin	Breda Brennan	3.9%	286	300	301	301	311	325	336	345				
Independent	Lisa Carroll	2.6%	191	216	251	251	258	263	275					
Green	Maolíosa Ní Chléirigh	2.2%	162	165	165	165	174							
Social Democrats	Sinead Ellen Griffin	1.9%	140	144	146	146	179	201						
People Before Profit	Patrick Curtin	1.8%	133	140	143	143								
Independent	Eric English	1.1%	81	89										
Electorate: 15,641 Valid: 7,402 Spoilt: 104 Quota: 1,058 Turnout: 7,506 (47.99%)

=== Co-options since 2024 Election ===
- †Dungarvan-Lismore Sinn Féin Cllr Conor D. McGuinness was elected as a TD for Waterford at the 2024 Irish general election. Kate O'Mahoney was selected to fill the vacancy on 16 December 2024.
