= 2019 Waterford City and County Council election =

Part of the 2019 Irish local elections

- 24 May 2019

All 32 seats on Waterford City and County Council 17 seats needed for a majority
	First party	Second party	Third party
Party	Fine Gael	Fianna Fáil	Sinn Féin
Seats won	7	7	6
Seat change	▼1	▼1	Steady
	Fourth party	Fifth party	Sixth party
Party	Labour	Green	Independent
Seats won	4	2	6
Seat change	▲3	▲2	▼3
- Results by local electoral area
Council control after election
Sinn Féin, Independent (5), Labour and Green Party

An election to all 32 seats on Waterford City and County Council was held on 24 May 2019 as part of the 2019 Irish local elections. The City and County of Waterford was divided into 6 local electoral areas (LEAs) to elect councillors for a five-year term of office on the electoral system of proportional representation by means of the single transferable vote (PR-STV).

Voters in Waterford also took part in a plebiscite on whether or not to establish the position of a directly elected mayor for the council under the Local Government Act 2019. The proposal was rejected by a narrow margin of 50.8% No to 49.2% Yes. Two other councils also held plebiscites on directly elected mayors: Cork City rejected the proposal, and Limerick was the only one of the three to vote Yes.

== Boundary review ==
Following the recommendations of the 2018 boundary review committee, there were significant changes to the LEAs used in the 2014 election due to terms of references requiring a maximum of seven councillors in each LEA and changes in population revealed in the 2016 census.

== Results by party ==
Party	Seats	±	1st pref	FPv%	±%
Fine Gael	7	▼1	11,043	25.01	▼0.09
Fianna Fáil	7	▼1	8,248	18.68	▼0.82
Sinn Féin	6	Steady	6,216	14.08	▼1.92
Labour	4	▲3	3,662	8.29	▲0.29
Green	2	▲2	2,659	6.02	▲6.02
People Before Profit	0	Steady	332	0.75	▲0.35
Renua	0	Steady	253	0.57	New
Aontú	0	Steady	246	0.56	New
Independent	6	▼3	11,501	26.04	▼1.26
Total	32	Steady	44,160	100.00	

== Results by local electoral area ==
*: Outgoing councillor elected in 2014.
†: Outgoing councillor coopted subsequent to the 2014 election.

=== Dungarvan ===
Dungarvan: 6 seats
Party	Candidate	FPv%	Count							
Party	Candidate	FPv%	1	2	3	4	5	6	7	8
Fine Gael	Damien Geoghegan	20.03%	1,716							
Fianna Fáil	Tom Cronin	14.08%	1,206	1,234						
Fine Gael	Pat Nugent	11.65%	998	1,081	1,094	1,121	1,171	1,211	1,313	
Sinn Féin	Conor D. McGuinness	9.01%	772	818	842	1,007	1,054	1,137	1,216	1,221
Independent	Seamus O'Donnell	8.32%	713	737	746	771	861	965	1,079	1,096
Labour	Thomas Phelan	7.87%	674	724	741	758	795	913	1,026	1,038
Fine Gael	Ian Noctor	6.69%	573	669	688	707	751	819	953	980
Independent	Joe O'Riordan	5.80%	497	529	552	578	653			
Fianna Fáil	Ann Marie Rossiter	5.73%	491	560	587	628	686	774		
Independent	Caren Hallahan	4.40%	377	403	449	471				
Sinn Féin	Siobhán Whelan	4.12%	353	379	391					
Independent	Ciara Langan	1.32%	113	117						
Fianna Fáil	Sean French	0.99%	85	92						
Electorate: 16,197 Valid: 8,568 Spoilt: 135 Quota: 1,225 Turnout: 8,703 (53.73%)

=== Lismore ===
Lismore: 3 seats
Party	Candidate	FPv%	Count	
Party	Candidate	FPv%	1	2
Labour	John Pratt	31.55%	1,385	
Fianna Fáil	James Tobin	27.52%	1,208	
Fine Gael	Declan Doocey	23.71%	1,041	1,205
Sinn Féin	Louise Brierley	9.68%	425	491
Green	Lynne Glasscoe	7.54%	331	388
Electorate: 9,226 Valid: 4,390 Spoilt: 86 Quota: 1,098 Turnout: 4,476 (48.52%)

=== Portlaw–Kilmacthomas ===
Portlaw–Kilmacthomas: 5 seats
Party	Candidate	FPv%	Count					
Party	Candidate	FPv%	1	2	3	4	5	6
Fine Gael	Seanie Power	21.17%	1,591	1,253				
Fine Gael	Liam Brazil	19.72%	1,482	1,482	1,253			
Fianna Fáil	John O'Leary	14.94%	1,123	1,163	1,204	1,273	1,253	
Labour	Ger Barron	13.05%	981	1,018	1,098	1,249	1,256	
Sinn Féin	Declan Clune	9.84%	740	762	771	860	861	1,028
Fianna Fáil	Ray Murphy	8.19%	616	708	721	770	778	963
Fine Gael	Mairead Coffey Jacob	5.92%	445	550	612	686	690	
Independent	Dolores Whelan	3.72%	280	305	319			
Independent	Ann Troy	3.45%	259	276	286			
Electorate: 14,318 Valid: 7,517 Spoilt: 152 Quota: 1,253 Turnout: 7,669 (53.6%)

=== Tramore–Waterford City West ===
Tramore–Waterford City West: 6 seats
Party	Candidate	FPv%	Count									
Party	Candidate	FPv%	1	2	3	4	5	6	7	8	9	10
Green	Marc Ó Cathasaigh (Note: See change below.)	14.28%	1,122	1,126	1,123							
Independent	Joe Conway	13.75%	1,080	1,083	1,083	1,097	1,126					
Fine Gael	Lola O'Sullivan	13.07%	1,027	1,031	1,031	1,052	1,062	1,183	1,183	1,123		
Independent	Joe Kelly	12.09%	950	963	964	976	1,002	1,014	1,062	1,069	1,102	1,143
Fianna Fáil	Eamon Quinlan	9.70%	762	769	770	836	844	868	920	946	969	1,002
Independent	Blaise Hannigan	8.74%	687	690	690	701	714	742	794	807	886	912
Sinn Féin	Jim Griffin	7.39%	581	589	589	596	614	620	626	629	691	979
Sinn Féin	Leslie Hughes	5.03%	395	399	399	405	425	430	437	439	523	
People Before Profit	Úna Dunphy	4.23%	332	333	333	341	349	368	385	394		
Renua	Michael Gallwey	3.22%	253	257	257	260	263	273				
Fine Gael	Maxine Keoghan	3.16%	248	250	251	254	257					
Fianna Fáil	Rita Lacey	2.16%	170	173	173							
Independent	Brendan Byrne	2.15%	169	176	176	182						
Independent	Melissa O'Neill	1.03%	81									
Electorate: 16,215 Valid: 7,857 Spoilt: 173 Quota: 1,123 Turnout: 8,030 (49.5%)

=== Waterford City East ===
Waterford City East: 6 seats
Party	Candidate	FPv%	Count						
Party	Candidate	FPv%	1	2	3	4	5	6	7
Independent	Matt Shanahan	20.32%	1,736						
Independent	David Daniels	14.06%	1,201	1,307					
Fianna Fáil	Eddie Mulligan	10.91%	932	1,010	1,071	1,083	1,153	1,195	1,267
Fianna Fáil	Adam Wyse	10.44%	892	966	1,032	1,052	1,122	1,202	1,308
Green	Jody Power	8.95%	765	833	908	928	975	1,038	1,141
Sinn Féin	Pat Fitzgerald	6.87%	587	602	611	615	664	936	1,086
Fine Gael	Sharon Carey	6.77%	578	612	639	653	831	871	950
Sinn Féin	Michael Doyle	6.27%	536	558	576	579	590		
Independent	Lee Walsh	6.12%	523	563	607	615	661	700	
Fine Gael	Fiona Dowd	5.64%	482	515	531	536			
Independent	Michael Garland	3.64%	311	356					
Electorate: 15,562 Valid: 8,543 Spoilt: 122 Quota: 1,221 Turnout: 8,665 (55.7%)

=== Waterford City South ===
Waterford City South: 6 seats
Party	Candidate	FPv%	Count									
Party	Candidate	FPv%	1	2	3	4	5	6	7	8	9	10
Sinn Féin	John Hearne	14.70%	1,071	1,071	1,041							
Fine Gael	John Cummins	11.83%	862	876	877	899	915	929	959	1,025	1,067	
Fianna Fáil	Jason Murphy	10.47%	763	772	774	840	850	870	919	960	1,015	1,028
Independent	Donal Barry	9.94%	724	751	753	782	840	868	946	1,008	1,163	1,041
Labour	Séamus Ryan	8.54%	622	627	629	640	653	672	729	812	879	893
Independent	Laurence (Cha) O'Neill	6.97%	508	515	517	543	554	584	637	665	756	788
Independent	Andrew Power	6.12%	446	470	471	488	518	535	586	627		
Sinn Féin	Breda Brennan	6.09%	444	456	464	471	502	649	702	774	835	863
Green	Susan Gallagher	6.05%	441	451	452	473	504	513	534			
Independent	Seán Reinhardt	5.59%	407	418	421	432	446	483				
Sinn Féin	Warren Fitzgerald	4.28%	312	331	339	347	370					
Independent	Vivienne Burns	3.68%	268	280	281	290						
Aontú	Ronan Cleary	3.38%	246	254	254							
Independent	Brendan Byrne	2.35%	171									
Electorate: 14,323 Valid: 7,285 Spoilt: 156 Quota: 1,041 Turnout: 7,441 (51.95%)

== Results by gender ==
2019 Waterford City and County Council election Candidates by gender
Gender	Number of candidates	% of candidates	Elected councillors	% of councillors
Men	46	69.7%	30	93.8%
Women	20	30.3%	2	6.3%
TOTAL	66		32	

== Plebiscite ==
2019 Waterford City and County Council Directly Elected Mayor plebiscite
Choice	Votes	%
For	21,718	49.19
Against	22,437	50.81
Total	44,155	100.00

== Changes after the 2019 election ==
=== Co-options ===
Party	Outgoing	LEA	Reason	Date	Co-optee
Green	Marc Ó Cathasaigh	Tramore–Waterford City West	Elected to the 33rd Dáil at the 2020 general election	25 February 2020	Laura Swift
Independent	Matt Shanahan	Waterford City East	Elected to the 33rd Dáil at the 2020 general election	25 February 2020	Mary Roche
Green	Laura Swift	Tramore–Waterford City West	Resignation on 6 May 2020 due to conflict with family mediation service	24 June 2020	Susan Gallagher
Fine Gael	John Cummins	Waterford City South	Elected to the 26th Seanad on the Labour Panel at the 2020 Seanad election	24 June 2020	Frank Quinlan
Fianna Fáil	James Tobin	Lismore	Death of councillor	July 2022	Mairéad Tobin
Fianna Fáil	Eddie Mulligan	Waterford City East	Resignation	August 2022	Stephanie Keating

=== Changes in affiliation ===
Name	LEA	Elected as	New affiliation	Date
Declan Clune	Portlaw–Kilmacthomas	Sinn Féin	Independent	1 September 2020
Mary Roche	Waterford City East	Independent	Social Democrats	November 2022
