= Maurice Cummins =

Irish politician (born 1953)

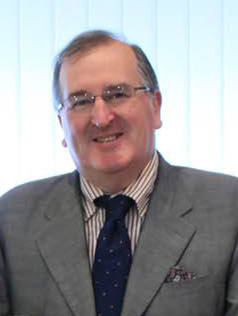
- Cummins in 2009

Leader of the Seanad
- In office 3 May 2011 – 8 June 2016
- Taoiseach: Enda Kenny
- Deputy: Ivana Bacik
- Preceded by: Donie Cassidy
- Succeeded by: Jerry Buttimer

Leader of Fine Gael in the Seanad
- In office 3 May 2011 – 8 June 2016
- Leader: Enda Kenny
- Preceded by: Frances Fitzgerald
- Succeeded by: Jerry Buttimer

Senator
- In office 12 September 2002 – 8 June 2016
- Constituency: Labour Panel

Personal details
- Born: 25 February 1953 (age 73) Waterford, Ireland
- Party: Fine Gael
- Children: John
- Education: University College Cork

Maurice Cummins (born 25 February 1953) is a former Irish Fine Gael politician who served as Leader of the Seanad and Leader of Fine Gael in the Seanad from 2011 to 2016. He was a Senator for Labour Panel from 2002 to 2016.

He was first elected as a Senator in 2002, for the Labour Panel, and was re-elected in 2007 and 2011. He was a member of Waterford City Council formerly Waterford Corporation from 1979 to 2002, and was Mayor of Waterford in 1995–1996. He was an unsuccessful Dáil candidate for the Waterford constituency at the 1992, 1997 and 2002 general elections.

He was the Leader of the Seanad from May 2011 until June 2016 when he lost his seat. A son, John Cummins, was elected to the Seanad in 2020.
