= 2009 Waterford City Council election =

Part of the 2009 Irish local elections

- 5 June 2009

All 15 seats on Waterford City Council
	First party	Second party	Third party
Party	Fine Gael	Labour	Fianna Fáil
Seats won	4	3	1
Seat change	0	0	0
	Fourth party	Fifth party	Sixth party
Party	Sinn Féin	Workers' Party	Independent
Seats won	1	1	5
Seat change	-1	-1	+2
- Map showing the area of Waterford City Council
Council control after election
TBD

An election to Waterford City Council took place on 5 June 2009 as part of that year's Irish local elections. 15 councillors were elected from three local electoral areas (LEAs) for a five-year term of office on the electoral system of proportional representation by means of the single transferable vote (PR-STV).

== Results by party ==
Party	Seats	±	First Pref. votes	FPv%	±%
Fine Gael	4	0	3,637	21.62	
Labour	3	0	2,831	16.83	
Fianna Fáil	1	0	2,212	13.15	
Sinn Féin	1	-1	1,543	9.17	
Workers' Party	1	-1	1,427	8.48	
Independent	5	+2	4,737	28.16	
Totals	15	0	16,823	100.00	—

== Results by local electoral area ==
=== Waterford City East ===
Waterford City East - 6 seats
Party	Candidate	FPv%	Count											
Party	Candidate	FPv%	1	2	3	4	5	6	7	8	9	10	11	12
Independent	Davy Daniels*	19.48	1,291											
Labour	Jack Walsh*	13.91	922	974										
Fine Gael	Jim D'Arcy*	12.30	815	864	867	891	908	927	944	964				
Fine Gael	Tom Cunningham*	8.87	588	629	632	641	656	669	682	708	711	748	778	942
Independent	Mary Roche*	6.93	459	504	509	536	557	600	628	651	652	711	778	890
Sinn Féin	Bill Hayes	6.05	401	412	414	416	424	428	433	438	441			
Fine Gael	Jacqueline Kelly	5.61	372	395	396	406	415	437	461	469	470	520	555	
Workers' Party	Joe Tobin	5.21	345	365	367	386	402	428	445	452	453	589	624	724
Fianna Fáil	Gary Wyse	4.75	315	328	331	338	346	356	375	458	463	485	686	732
Fianna Fáil	Catherine O'Neil	4.21	279	291	294	298	305	317	383	456	457	478		
Fianna Fáil	Pat Ormond	3.49	231	244	245	246	247	248	280					
Fianna Fáil	Stephanie Keating	3.11	206	224	224	224	234	247						
Independent	Michael Ivory	2.16	143	174	176	181	194							
Independent	Sheikh M. Ahmed	1.96	130	141	142	150								
Green	Maria Raftis Kennedy	1.95	129	134	135									
Electorate: 10,094 Valid: 6,626 (65.64%) Spoilt: 62 Quota: 947 Turnout: 6,688 (66.26%)

=== Waterford City North ===
Waterford City North - 4 seats
Party	Candidate	FPv%	Count					
Party	Candidate	FPv%	1	2	3	4	5	6
Fine Gael	Hilary Quinlan*	22.58	963					
Labour	Pat Hayes*	21.57	920					
Independent	Dick Roche	14.68	626	655	660	678	725	822
Sinn Féin	Joe Kelly*	12.94	552	575	575	588	605	685
Workers' Party	Davy Walsh*	12.54	535	564	568	590	631	752
Fianna Fáil	Liam Dunne	6.66	284	292	294	299	324	
Fianna Fáil	Gearoid Ryan	4.85	207	211	212	214	220	
Independent	Oli Dempsey	3.63	155	168	176	182		
Independent	Ram Ramasamy	0.54	23	26				
Electorate: 6,965 Valid: 4,265 (61.23%) Spoilt: 88 Quota: 894 Turnout: 4,353 (62.50%)

=== Waterford City South ===
Waterford City South - 5 seats
Party	Candidate	FPv%	Count					
Party	Candidate	FPv%	1	2	3	4	5	6
Independent	John Halligan*	18.65	1,430					
Labour	Seamus Ryan*	16.67	989					
Sinn Féin	David Cullinane*	9.95	590	684	697	785	825	912
Fine Gael	John Cummins	9.09	539	594	605	638	840	943
Fianna Fáil	Tom Murphy*	9.27	550	579	655	676	706	
Workers' Party	Willie Moore	9.20	546	615	621	715	732	824
Independent	Laurence (Cha) O'Neill*	7.69	456	540	562	627	731	880
Fine Gael	Mary O'Halloran*	6.07	360	400	419	447		
People Before Profit	Donie Fell	5.19	308	358	373			
Fianna Fáil	Elaine Walsh	2.36	140	153				
Independent	Ram Ramasamy	0.40	24	31				
Electorate: 9,339 Valid: 5,932 (63.52%) Spoilt: 66 Quota: 989 Turnout: 5,998 (64.23%)
