= Dungarvan Courthouse =

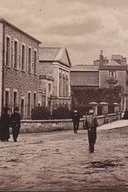
- Dungarvan Courthouse

- Location within Ireland

General information
- Architectural style: Neoclassical style
- Location: Dungarvan, County Waterford, Ireland
- Coordinates: 52.0907°N 7.6205°W
- Completed: 1820

Design and construction
- Architect: James Pain

Dungarvan Courthouse is a judicial facility in Meagher Street, Dungarvan, County Waterford, Ireland.

== History ==
The courthouse, which was designed by James Pain in the neoclassical style and built in ashlar stone, was completed in 1820. The design involved a symmetrical main frontage with five bays facing Meagher Street; the central section of three bays, which slightly projected forward, featured three rounded headed sash windows on the first floor flanked by pilasters supporting an entablature and a pediment.

The building was originally used as a facility for dispensing justice but, following the implementation of the Local Government (Ireland) Act 1898, which established county councils in every county, it also became the meeting place for the second and subsequent meetings of Waterford County Council. (Note: The first meeting had been held at Waterford Courthouse.) The county council established their County Secretary's Office at Arus Brugha at Davitt's Quay in the early-20th century before moving to modern Civic Offices at Davitt's Quay in 1999.
