= WRH =

WRH, or wrh, may refer to:

- Waterford Regional Hospital, a hospital in Waterford, Ireland, now renamed University Hospital Waterford
- wrh, the ISO 639-3 code for the Wiradjuri language, a traditional language of the Wiradjuri people of Australia
- WRH, the National Rail code for Worthing railway station in West Sussex, UK
