= Christopher O'Sullivan =

Irish politician (born 1982)

Christopher O'Sullivan TD
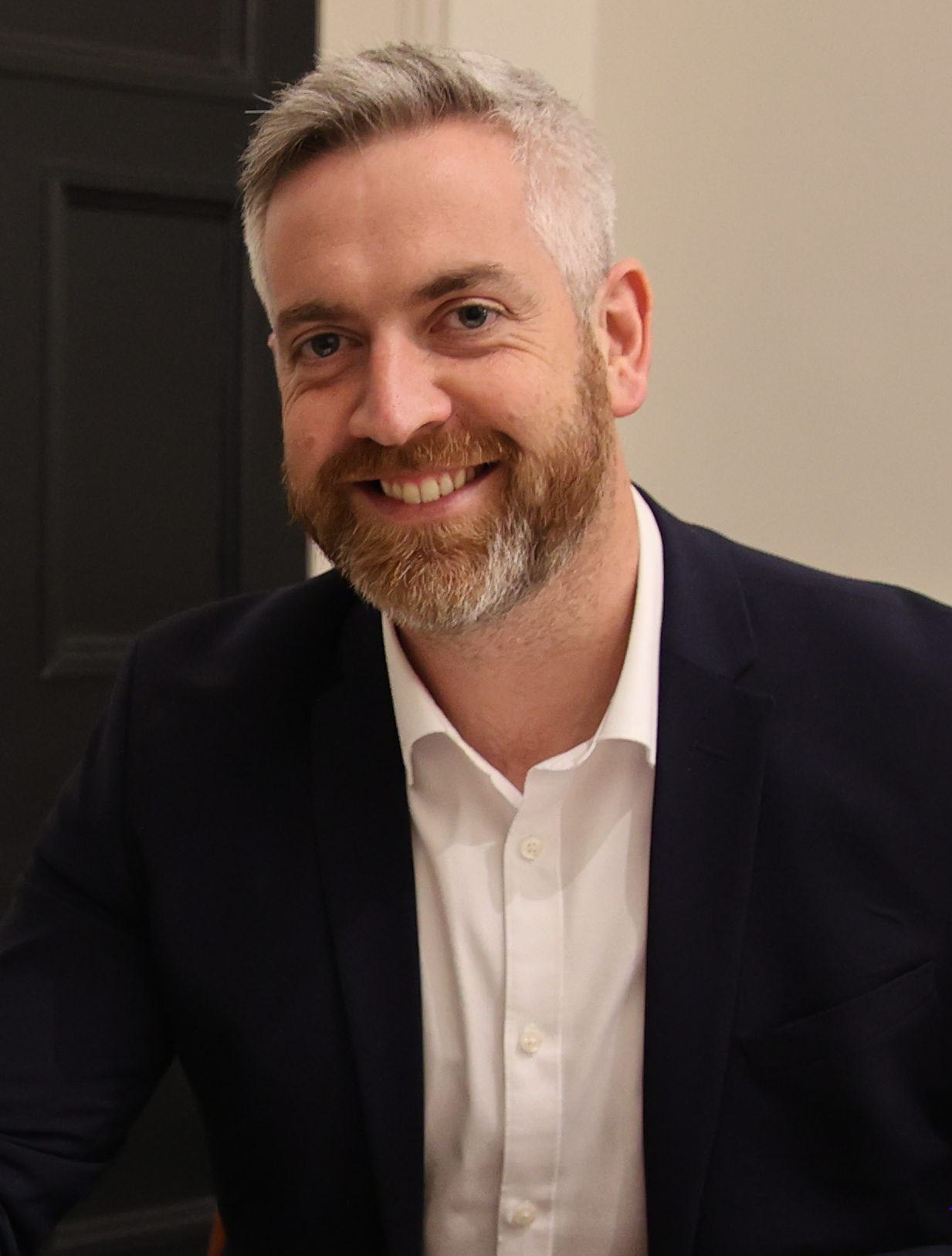
- O'Sullivan in 2024

Minister of State
- 2025–: Housing, Local Government and Heritage

Teachta Dála
- Incumbent
- Assumed office February 2020
- Constituency: Cork South-West

Personal details
- Born: 2 June 1982 (age 44) Cork, Ireland
- Party: Fianna Fáil
- Parent: Christy O'Sullivan (father)
- Education: University of Limerick

Christopher O'Sullivan (born 2 June 1982) is an Irish Fianna Fáil politician who has served as Minister of State at the Department of Housing, Local Government and Heritage since January 2025 and a Teachta Dála (TD) for the Cork South-West constituency since the 2020 general election.

== Early ==
O'Sullivan is a law graduate of the University of Limerick. His father, Christy O'Sullivan, served as a Fianna Fáil TD from 2007 to 2011.

== Political career ==
=== Cork County Council ===
O'Sullivan was co-opted onto Cork County Council in 2007, replacing his father, Christy O'Sullivan. He was subsequently re-elected in the 2009, 2014 and 2019 local elections. He served as Mayor of Cork County Council from 2019 to 2020. Deirdre Kelly was co-opted to O'Sullivan's seat on Cork County Council following his election to the Dáil.

=== Dáil Éireann ===
O'Sullivan was elected to the 33rd Dail at the 2020 general election, taking the second seat in the Cork South-West constituency. He received 6,292 first preference votes, taking 14.1% of first presences votes overall.

At the 2024 general election, O'Sullivan was re-elected to the Dáil. On 29 January 2025, he was appointed as Minister of State at the Department of Housing, Local Government and Heritage with special responsibility for nature, heritage and biodiversity.

=== Expenses controversy ===
In 2025, the Irish Examiner reported that O'Sullivan, while serving as a councillor in 2008, had claimed €30,000 in payments and expenses, while travelling for a six month period in Australia, New Zealand, and South America. O'Sullivan defended his actions, saying "Any allowances or payments over 2008 [were] in full compliance with the laws and regulations then in force. My absence whilst travelling was under a continuous period of six consecutive months."

== Personal life ==
O'Sullivan was previously in a relationship with fellow Cork TD Holly Cairns of Social Democrats. However, the relationship ended in 2020; Cairns cited pressure from social media for Cairns and O'Sullivan to answer for each other's political decisions as having negatively impacted upon them.

== See also ==
- Families in the Oireachtas

Political offices
| Preceded by Alan Dillon; Malcolm Noonan | Minister of State at the Department of Housing, Local Government and Heritage; 2025–present With: John Cummins; Kieran O'Donnell | Incumbent |

| Dáil | Election | Deputy (Party) | Deputy (Party) | Deputy (Party) |
|---|---|---|---|---|
| 17th | 1961 | Seán Collins (FG) | Michael Pat Murphy (Lab) | Edward Cotter (FF) |
| 18th | 1965 | Seán Collins (FG) | Michael Pat Murphy (Lab) | Edward Cotter (FF) |
| 19th | 1969 | John O'Sullivan (FG) | Michael Pat Murphy (Lab) | Flor Crowley (FF) |
| 20th | 1973 | John O'Sullivan (FG) | Michael Pat Murphy (Lab) | Flor Crowley (FF) |
| 21st | 1977 | Jim O'Keeffe (FG) | Michael Pat Murphy (Lab) | Joe Walsh (FF) |
| 22nd | 1981 | Jim O'Keeffe (FG) | P. J. Sheehan (FG) | Flor Crowley (FF) |
| 23rd | 1982 (Feb) | Jim O'Keeffe (FG) | P. J. Sheehan (FG) | Joe Walsh (FF) |
| 24th | 1982 (Nov) | Jim O'Keeffe (FG) | P. J. Sheehan (FG) | Joe Walsh (FF) |
| 25th | 1987 | Jim O'Keeffe (FG) | P. J. Sheehan (FG) | Joe Walsh (FF) |
| 26th | 1989 | Jim O'Keeffe (FG) | P. J. Sheehan (FG) | Joe Walsh (FF) |
| 27th | 1992 | Jim O'Keeffe (FG) | P. J. Sheehan (FG) | Joe Walsh (FF) |
| 28th | 1997 | Jim O'Keeffe (FG) | P. J. Sheehan (FG) | Joe Walsh (FF) |
| 29th | 2002 | Jim O'Keeffe (FG) | Denis O'Donovan (FF) | Joe Walsh (FF) |
| 30th | 2007 | Jim O'Keeffe (FG) | P. J. Sheehan (FG) | Christy O'Sullivan (FF) |
| 31st | 2011 | Jim Daly (FG) | Noel Harrington (FG) | Michael McCarthy (Lab) |
| 32nd | 2016 | Jim Daly (FG) | Michael Collins (Ind.) | Margaret Murphy O'Mahony (FF) |
| 33rd | 2020 | Holly Cairns (SD) | Michael Collins (Ind.) | Christopher O'Sullivan (FF) |
| 34th | 2024 | Holly Cairns (SD) | Michael Collins (II) | Christopher O'Sullivan (FF) |
