= 2009 Waterford County Council election =

Part of the 2009 Irish local elections

- 5 June 2009

All 23 seats on Waterford County Council
	First party	Second party	Third party
Party	Fine Gael	Fianna Fáil	Labour
Seats won	11	5	4
Seat change	Steady	▼2	Steady
	Fourth party	Fifth party
Party	Sinn Féin	Independent
Seats won	2	1
Seat change	▲1	▲1
- Area of Waterford County Council

An election to all 23 seats on Waterford County Council took place on 5 June 2009 as part of the 2009 Irish local elections. County Waterford was divided into four local electoral areas (LEAs) to elect councillors for a five-year term of office on the electoral system of proportional representation by means of the single transferable vote (PR-STV).

== Results by party ==
Party	Seats	±	First Pref. votes	FPv%	±%
Fine Gael	11	Steady	13,939	44.25	
Fianna Fáil	5	▼2	8,079	25.65	
Labour	4	Steady	4,369	13.87	
Sinn Féin	2	▲1	1,734	5.50	
Independent	1	▲1	3,067	9.74	
Total	23	Steady	31,503	100.00	—

== Results by local electoral area ==
=== Comeragh ===
Comeragh: 6 seats
Party	Candidate	FPv%	Count						
Party	Candidate	FPv%	1	2	3	4	5	6	7
Fine Gael	Liam Brazil*	21.01	1,732						
Fine Gael	Brendan Coffey*	17.29	1,429						
Fianna Fáil	Michael J. O'Ryan*	16.11	1,329						
Labour	Ger Barron*	12.39	1,020	1,169	1,221				
Fine Gael	Mary Greene*	10.43	860	1,108	1,227				
Fianna Fáil	John O'Leary	9.08	748	787	822	903	976	1,001	1,015
Fianna Fáil	Benji Whelan	8.87	732	806	830	914	991	1,006	1,014
Independent	Michael Flynn	4.82	398	441	461				
Electorate: 13,086 Valid: 8,249 (63.04%) Spoilt: 120 Quota: 1,179 Turnout: 8,369 (63.95%)

=== Dungarvan ===
Dungarvan: 6 seats
Party	Candidate	FPv%	Count					
Party	Candidate	FPv%	1	2	3	4	5	6
Fine Gael	Damien Geoghegan*	15.32	1,300					
Fine Gael	Pat Nugent*	14.31	1,214					
Sinn Féin	Brendan Mansfield*	11.52	978	991	1,047	1,084	1,279	
Labour	Billy Kyne*	11.30	959	974	1,029	1,071	1,130	1,141
Fianna Fáil	Tom Cronin*	10.30	874	877	907	1,140	1,294	
Fine Gael	Tom Higgins*	8.79	746	769	909	982	1,071	1,100
Labour	Teresa Wright*	8.72	740	755	800	857	974	989
Independent	Seamus O'Donnell	8.48	720	724	789	830		
Fianna Fáil	Ollie Wilkinson	6.01	510	514	532			
Fine Gael	Jimmy Breathnach	5.24	445	455				
Electorate: 13,856 Valid: 8,486 (61.24%) Spoilt: 92 Quota: 1,213 Turnout: 8,578 (61.91%)

=== Lismore ===
Lismore: 4 seats
Party	Candidate	FPv%	Count			
Party	Candidate	FPv%	1	2	3	4
Fianna Fáil	James Tobin*	17.60	1,023	1,264		
Fine Gael	Nora Flynn*	16.05	933	1,009	1,020	1,170
Fine Gael	Liam Curran	15.07	876	909	910	977
Labour	John Pratt	14.38	836	892	902	1,059
Fine Gael	Declan Doocey*	14.14	822	895	913	1,126
Fianna Fáil	Bernard Leddy	11.68	679	806	867	
Fianna Fáil	Kevin Wilkinson*	11.08	644			
Electorate: 9,548 Valid: 5,813 (60.88%) Spoilt: 89 Quota: 1,163 Turnout: 5,902 (61.81%)

=== Tramore ===
Tramore: 7 seats
Party	Candidate	FPv%	Count								
Party	Candidate	FPv%	1	2	3	4	5	6	7	8	9
Fine Gael	John Carey*	12.43	1,113	1,118	1,129						
Fine Gael	Lola O'Sullivan*	9.55	855	864	880	899	944	1,016	1,113	1,115	1,144
Fine Gael	Ann Marie Power*	9.48	849	856	871	904	955	994	1,099	1,099	1,122
Labour	Paddy O'Callaghan*	9.09	814	840	860	870	895	962	1,060	1,061	1,087
Independent	Joe Conway	8.69	778	793	821	844	907	965	1,067	1,069	1,104
Fine Gael	Pat Barron	8.44	765	766	774	788	801	829	868	870	892
Sinn Féin	Pat Fitzgerald	8.44	756	773	784	792	801	814	845	845	1,040
Fianna Fáil	Pat Daly*	7.56	677	681	685	739	756	774	807	807	1,016
Fianna Fáil	Geoff Power	6.92	620	620	622	660	669	677	694	695	
Independent	Blaise Hannigan	5.34	478	507	547	561	632	658			
Green	Stan Nangle	3.52	315	321	348	354	371				
Independent	Pat Finnerty	3.25	291	306	329	344					
Fianna Fáil	Joe O'Shea	2.71	243	247	249						
Independent	James McCartan	2.50	224	232							
Independent	Eddie Walsh	1.99	178								
Electorate: 15,451 Valid: 8,956 (57.96%) Spoilt: 97 Quota: 1,120 Turnout: 9,053 (58.59%)
