= Waterford Courthouse =

Neoclassical courthouse in Waterford, Ireland

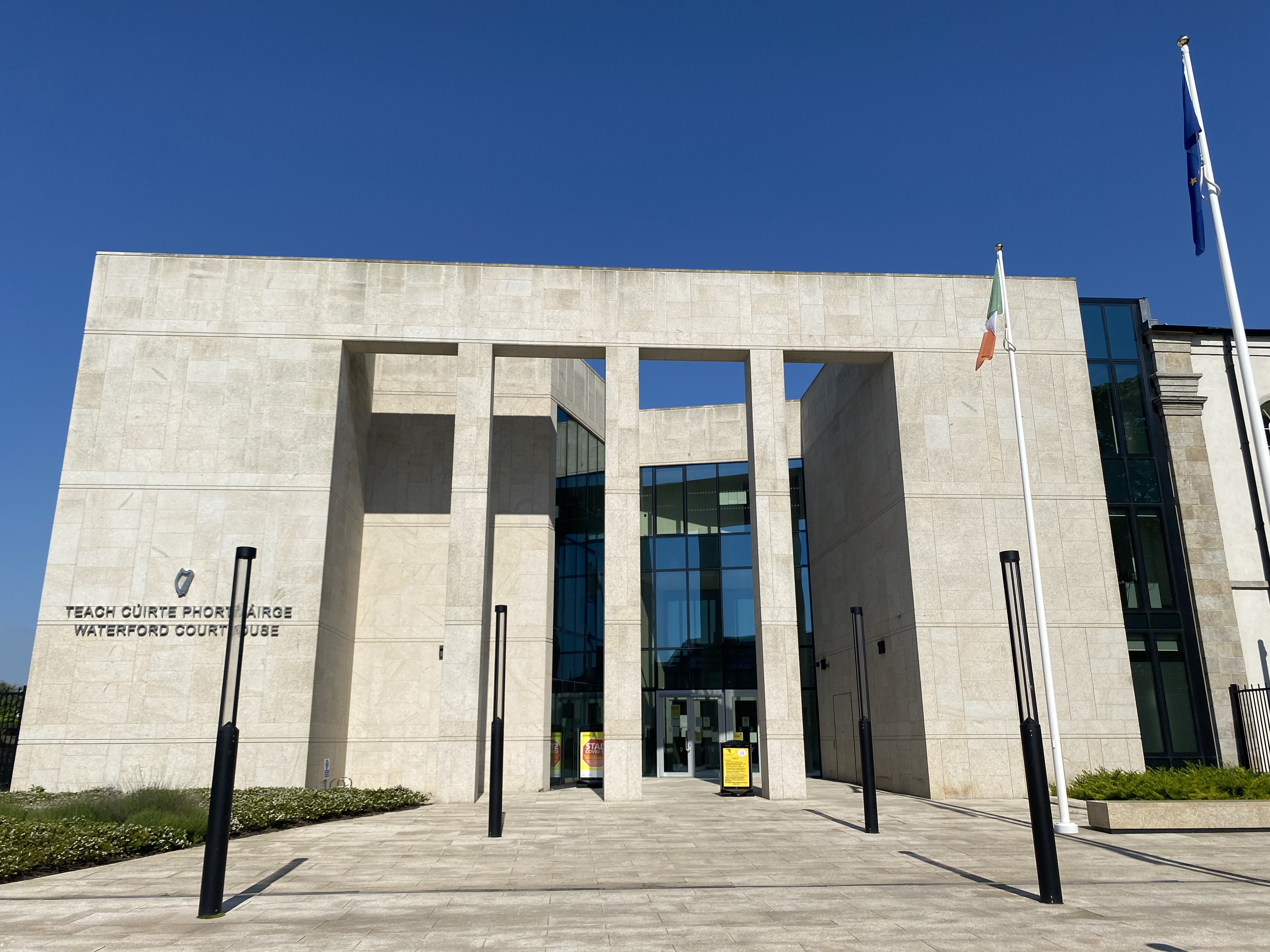

- Location within Ireland

General information
- Architectural style: Neoclassical style
- Location: Waterford, County Waterford, Ireland
- Coordinates: 52.2574°N 7.1063°W
- Completed: 1849

Design and construction
- Architect: John B. Keane

Waterford Courthouse is a judicial facility in Catherine Street, Waterford, County Waterford, Ireland.

== History ==
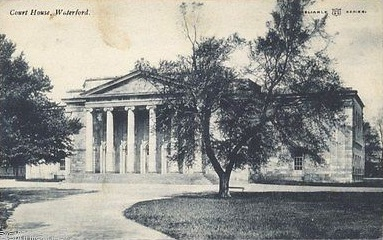
Waterford Courthouse, 1906

The current building is the second courthouse to occupy the site. It replaced a courthouse designed by James Gandon which was constructed in 1784, and occupied the site until roughly 1840. In the 12th century, the Augustinian Priory of St Catherine occupied the site. The courthouse was designed by John B. Keane. The builder was Terence O'Reilly, and was built between 1848 and 1849. The building was originally used as a facility for dispensing justice but, following the implementation of the Local Government (Ireland) Act 1898, which established county councils in every county, it also became the first meeting place for Waterford County Council. It was agreed, however, that subsequent meetings would be held at Dungarvan Courthouse.

By the 1970s, the building had fallen into a state of serious disrepair, and in 1977 roughly two-thirds of the original building was demolished. All that was left was the front façade, the "shell" of the two courtooms, and the concourse which linked them. The interior of the courthouse was refurbished in 1980.

Extensive refurbishment and expansion of the courthouse began in 2015. As part of these works, a disused fire station was demolished, as was the original 1984 extension of the courthouse. The Waterford Courthouse was officially re-opened by Charles Flanagan, Minister for Justice and Equality, in April 2018.

== Architecture ==
Built of ashlar granite, the original courthouse building is in the neoclassical style, and features a pedimented hexastyle Ionic portico. It is similar to in both plan and elevation to Tullamore Courthouse and Ennis Courthouse, both of which were also designed by Keane. As part of the 2015-2018 renovations, a granite-paved plaza was created on Catherine Street, in place of the old fire station.

Originally built with two courtrooms, following the 2015–2018 renovations, the courthouse now contains 6 courtrooms. The building features a four-storey atrium which acts as a rotunda, with entrances to all 6 of the courtrooms accessible from this central space.
