= City Hall, Waterford =

Municipal building in Waterford, Ireland

- Halla na Cathrach, Port Láirge
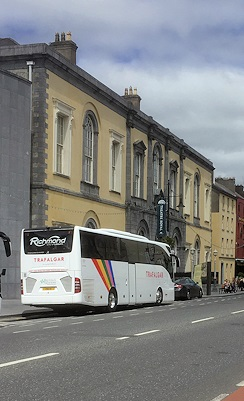
- City Hall, Waterford

- Location within Ireland

General information
- Architectural style: Neoclassical style
- Location: The Mall, Waterford, Ireland
- Coordinates: 52.2598°N 7.1066°W
- Completed: 1783

Design and construction
- Architect: John Roberts

City Hall (Irish: Halla na Cathrach, Port Láirge) is a municipal facility in The Mall, Waterford, Ireland. It is one of the two administrative centres of Waterford City and County Council.

== History ==
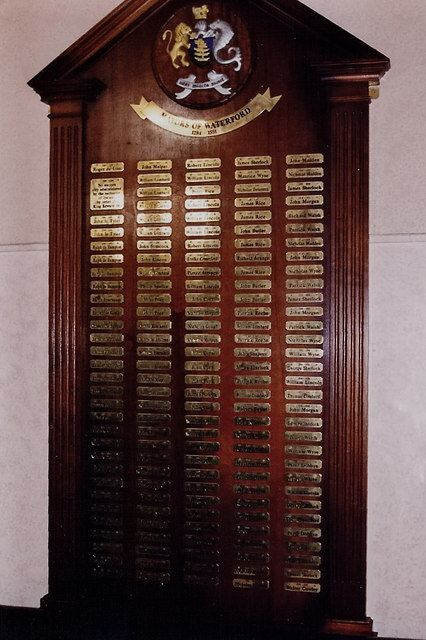
City Hall plaque listing mayors of Waterford from 1284 to 1553

The building was commissioned as the assembly rooms and theatre for the city. The site selected contained sections of the medieval city wall, dating from circa 1150. It was designed by John Roberts in the neoclassical style, built with a painted render finish and was completed in 1783.

The design involved a symmetrical main frontage of nine bays facing onto The Mall. The central section of the three bays, which was faced in rusticated stone on the ground floor, featured a slightly recessed round headed doorway with an architrave flanked by two slightly recessed round headed windows with architraves. On the first floor, there was a slightly recessed round headed window with an architrave, flanked by two square headed windows with architraves and pediments. The bays in the central section were separated by Ionic order columns supporting a frieze and a cornice. The outer sections of three bays each were fenestrated on both floors by slightly recessed round headed windows with architraves flanked by square headed windows with cornices supported by brackets. Internally, the principal rooms were the committee room, the council chambers, and the Long Room, all on the first floor. The chandelier in the council chamber was made by Waterford Crystal and a copy of it was installed in Independence Hall in Philadelphia.

The ground floor of the building was leased to Waterford Corporation until 1813, when the corporation acquired the freehold of the building. The building was used for important public events: in June 1831, there was meeting in the city hall of the Protestant Colonisation Society of Ireland, the objective of which was to ensure that Protestant colonies were spread across Ireland, and to prevent the dispersion of poor Protestants to areas where they could not be cared for. The American abolitionist, Frederick Douglass, gave a speech advocating the abolition of slavery in the Long Room in October 1845.

In July 1848, the businessman and politician, Thomas Meager, attended city hall to sign up as a special constable; his son, Thomas Francis Meagher, was tried and convicted of sedition the following month. Then in 1870, one wing of the building was converted for use as the Theatre Royal, the auditorium for which was laid out in a horseshoe-shape. King Edward VII visited the building and was entertained by the Mayor, James Aloysius Power, in May 1904, and the Irish nationalist, James Connolly, spoke at a trades union meeting in the building in February 1912.

The building was also the venue for important social events including the annual "Beagle Ball" which was held in the building at least until the 1940s. It was extended to the southwest to create additional facilities for the Theatre Royal, to a design by DHB Architects in 1998. In November 2014, the Chief Justice of Ireland, Susan Denham, gave a talk in the building on the career of John Hearne who drafted the Constitution of Ireland.

A landscape painting by Willem Van der Hagen, depicting a view of Waterford, was displayed in the city hall before it was re-located to the Bishop's Palace.
