= Matt Shanahan (politician) =

Irish politician (born 1964)

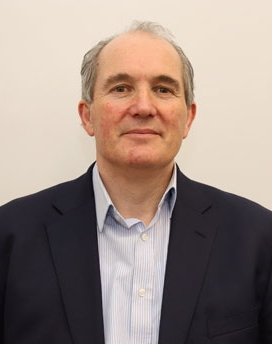
- Shanahan in 2020

Teachta Dála
- In office February 2020 – November 2024
- Constituency: Waterford

Personal details
- Born: 19 May 1964 (age 62) Waterford, Ireland
- Party: Independent
- Spouse: Elaine Shanahan (m. 1997)
- Children: 3
- Education: Dublin Institute of Technology

Matt Shanahan (born 19 May 1964) is an Irish former independent politician who was a Teachta Dála (TD) for the Waterford constituency from 2020 to 2024.

== Before politics ==
Matt Shanahan was born in 1964. His father was a doctor in Ardkeen Hospital, and his mother was a home economics teacher by profession. Shanahan attended St Augustine's College, Dungarvan. He worked for Dawn Meats and in the United States before receiving a degree in marketing in Morehampton College, Dublin and moving back to Waterford.

In 2004, Shanahan founded Velocity Media, a Waterford-based mobile billboard company. He has also done consultancy in digital marketing and advising small businesses on applying for state and EU grants.

== Political career ==
According to the Irish Independent, Shanahan has "strong Fine Gael ties". In 2012, he founded South East Hospitals Action Alliance, an advocacy group to protest downgrading of Waterford Regional Hospital (now University Hospital Waterford, UHW) in the 2012 budget. In 2016, he founded Health Equality For the South East, to improve UHW cardiology services with a second cath lab and 24/7 percutaneous coronary intervention capability.

In December 2018, Mary Roche, an independent Waterford City and County Councillor resigned her seat in the Waterford City East local electoral area. She nominated Shanahan to replace her. In line with the local rules requiring a vote to be held in place of a co-optation, a convention was held on 10 January 2019 and the remaining councillors duly voted 25–5 on to co-opt Shanahan to Roche's vacant seat, with Sinn Féin councillors voting against his nomination. He retained his seat in the 2019 local elections, topping the poll, and commenting, "it's not a strong vote for Matt Shanahan, it's a strong vote on the whole hospital issue here in the South-East". Mary Roche, the former independent councillor from which Shanahan inherited his seat, was co-opted to Shanahan's seat on Waterford City and County Council following his election to the Dáil.

On 14 January 2020, Shanahan announced he would be standing in the general election to be held on 8 February. While The Irish Times said he was 'seen as the single-issue "hospital candidate"', Shanahan also mentioned university status for Waterford Institute of Technology and "the increasing inequality glaringly apparent between economic measures and development in the South East versus similar city regions in Ireland". He was elected on the seventh count. He lost his seat at the 2024 general election. He unsuccessfully contested the 2025 Seanad election.

== Personal life ==
Shanahan and his wife Elaine have three children. He has coached underage hurling at Ballygunner GAA.

In 2021, Shanahan was the subject of controversy after he made a post on Twitter in response to a woman sharing her experience of being harassed, for which he was accused of "victim blaming".

== See also ==
- Tom Foxe, TD elected in 1989 to keep Roscommon Hospital open

Dáil	Election	Deputy (Party)	Deputy (Party)	Deputy (Party)	Deputy (Party)
4th	1923	Caitlín Brugha (Rep)	John Butler (Lab)	Nicholas Wall (FP)	William Redmond (NL)
5th	1927 (Jun)	Caitlín Brugha (Rep)	Patrick Little (FF)	Vincent White (CnaG)	William Redmond (NL)
6th	1927 (Sep)	Seán Goulding (FF)	Patrick Little (FF)	Vincent White (CnaG)	William Redmond (NL)
7th	1932	Seán Goulding (FF)	Patrick Little (FF)	John Kiersey (CnaG)	William Redmond (CnaG)
8th	1933	Seán Goulding (FF)	Patrick Little (FF)	Nicholas Wall (NCP)	Bridget Redmond (CnaG)
9th	1937	Michael Morrissey (FF)	Patrick Little (FF)	Nicholas Wall (FG)	Bridget Redmond (FG)
10th	1938	Michael Morrissey (FF)	Patrick Little (FF)	William Broderick (FG)	Bridget Redmond (FG)
11th	1943	Michael Morrissey (FF)	Patrick Little (FF)	Denis Heskin (CnaT)	Bridget Redmond (FG)
12th	1944	Michael Morrissey (FF)	Patrick Little (FF)	Denis Heskin (CnaT)	Bridget Redmond (FG)
12th	1947 by-election	John Ormonde (FF)	Patrick Little (FF)	Denis Heskin (CnaT)	Bridget Redmond (FG)
13th	1948	John Ormonde (FF)	Patrick Little (FF)	Thomas Kyne (Lab)	Bridget Redmond (FG)
14th	1951	John Ormonde (FF)	Patrick Little (FF)	Thomas Kyne (Lab)	Bridget Redmond (FG)
14th	1952 by-election	John Ormonde (FF)	Patrick Little (FF)	Thomas Kyne (Lab)	William Kenneally (FF)
15th	1954	John Ormonde (FF)	Thaddeus Lynch (FG)	Thomas Kyne (Lab)	William Kenneally (FF)
16th	1957	John Ormonde (FF)	Thaddeus Lynch (FG)	Thomas Kyne (Lab)	William Kenneally (FF)
17th	1961	John Ormonde (FF)	Thaddeus Lynch (FG)	Thomas Kyne (Lab)	3 seats 1961–1977
18th	1965	Billy Kenneally (FF)	Thaddeus Lynch (FG)	Thomas Kyne (Lab)	3 seats 1961–1977
18th	1966 by-election	Billy Kenneally (FF)	Fad Browne (FF)	Thomas Kyne (Lab)	3 seats 1961–1977
19th	1969	Billy Kenneally (FF)	Fad Browne (FF)	Edward Collins (FG)	3 seats 1961–1977
20th	1973	Billy Kenneally (FF)	Thomas Kyne (Lab)	Edward Collins (FG)	3 seats 1961–1977
21st	1977	Billy Kenneally (FF)	Jackie Fahey (FF)	Edward Collins (FG)	Austin Deasy (FG)
22nd	1981	Billy Kenneally (FF)	Jackie Fahey (FF)	Edward Collins (FG)	Austin Deasy (FG)
23rd	1982 (Feb)	Paddy Gallagher (SF–WP)	Jackie Fahey (FF)	Edward Collins (FG)	Austin Deasy (FG)
24th	1982 (Nov)	Donal Ormonde (FF)	Jackie Fahey (FF)	Edward Collins (FG)	Austin Deasy (FG)
25th	1987	Martin Cullen (PDs)	Jackie Fahey (FF)	Brian Swift (FF)	Austin Deasy (FG)
26th	1989	Brian O'Shea (Lab)	Jackie Fahey (FF)	Brendan Kenneally (FF)	Austin Deasy (FG)
27th	1992	Brian O'Shea (Lab)	Martin Cullen (PDs)	Brendan Kenneally (FF)	Austin Deasy (FG)
28th	1997	Brian O'Shea (Lab)	Martin Cullen (FF)	Brendan Kenneally (FF)	Austin Deasy (FG)
29th	2002	Brian O'Shea (Lab)	Martin Cullen (FF)	Ollie Wilkinson (FF)	John Deasy (FG)
30th	2007	Brian O'Shea (Lab)	Martin Cullen (FF)	Brendan Kenneally (FF)	John Deasy (FG)
31st	2011	Ciara Conway (Lab)	John Halligan (Ind.)	Paudie Coffey (FG)	John Deasy (FG)
32nd	2016	David Cullinane (SF)	John Halligan (Ind.)	Mary Butler (FF)	John Deasy (FG)
33rd	2020	David Cullinane (SF)	Marc Ó Cathasaigh (GP)	Mary Butler (FF)	Matt Shanahan (Ind.)
34th	2024	David Cullinane (SF)	Conor D. McGuinness (SF)	Mary Butler (FF)	John Cummins (FG)
