= University Hospital Waterford =

Hospital in Waterford, Ireland

- Health Service Executive
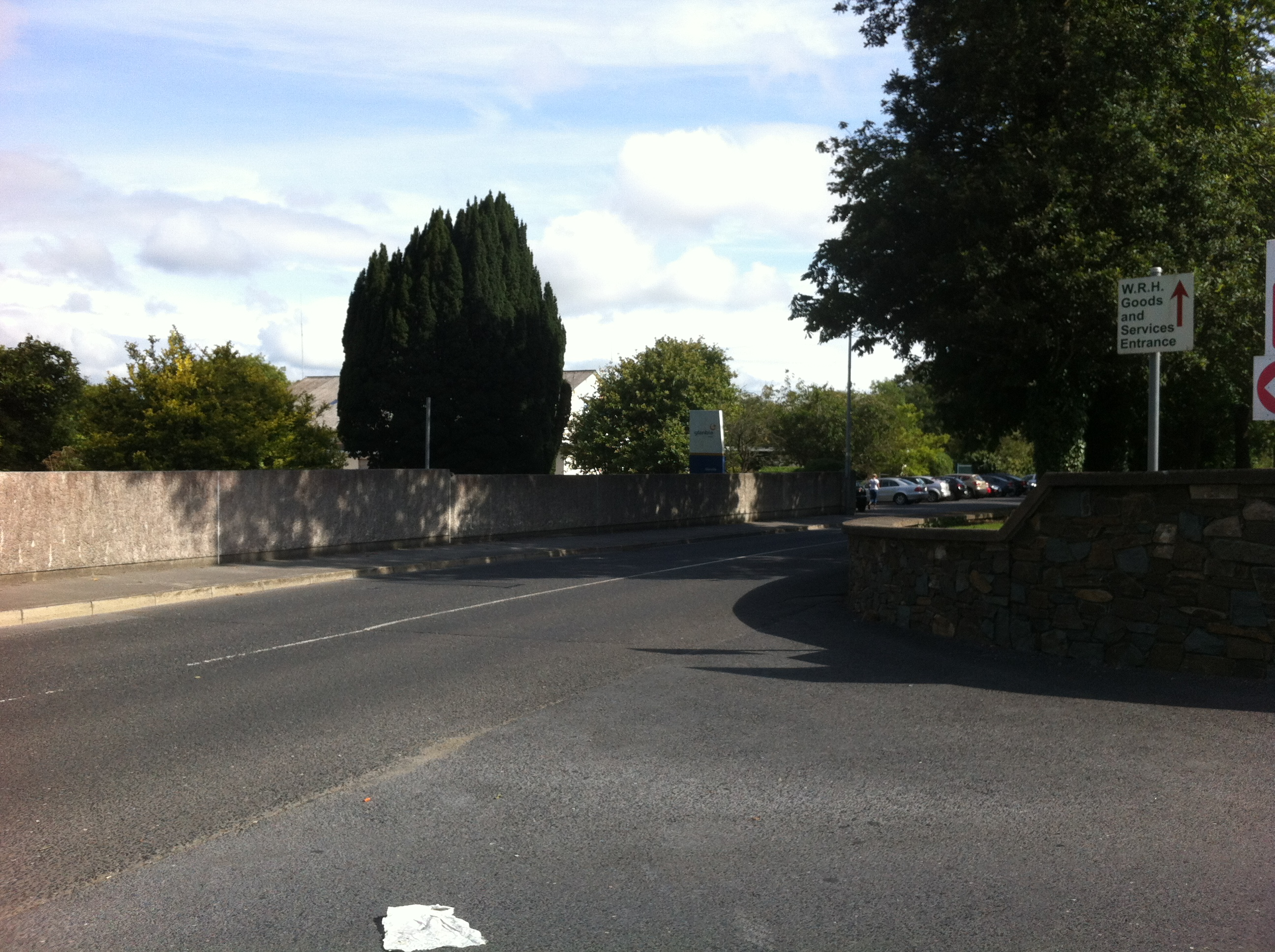
- An entrance at Waterford Regional Hospital

- Shown in Ireland

Geography
- Location: Dunmore Road, County Waterford, Ireland
- Coordinates: 52.2487°N 7.0785°W

Organisation
- Care system: HSE
- Type: Regional
- Affiliated university: University College Cork; Royal College of Surgeons in Ireland; Waterford Institute of Technology

Services
- Emergency department: Yes
- Beds: 429

History
- Founded: 1952

Links
- Website: Hospital's pages on the HSE site

University Hospital Waterford (Irish: Ospidéal na hOllscoile, Port Láirge), formerly known as Waterford Regional Hospital (WRH), is a teaching hospital located in Waterford, County Waterford, Ireland. It is managed by South/Southwest Hospital Group.

== History ==
The hospital has its origins in the Ardkeen Chest Hospital which was established in 1952. After services had been transferred from St. Patrick's Hospital, Waterford in 1959, the chest hospital developed into a general hospital known as Waterford Regional Hospital (WRH). New facilities including a new accident and emergency department, a new neonatal unit, and a new CT scanning unit were officially opened by James Reilly, Minister of Health, in May 2014. The hospital was renamed University Hospital Waterford at that time.

In April 2019, it was claimed that bodies had been 'left to decompose' on trolleys at the hospital.

In 2016 local businessman Matt Shanahan began a campaign to improve UHW cardiology services with a second cath lab and 24/7 percutaneous coronary intervention capability. It was the main plank of his successful election campaigns as an independent candidate in the 2019 local election and the 2020 general election.

== Services ==
The hospital provides 429 beds, of which 71 are reserved for acute day cases. A further 45 beds are for psychiatric services. University College Cork is its primary academic partner, and it is also affiliated with the Royal College of Surgeons in Ireland and Waterford Institute of Technology.
