= Willem Van der Hagen =

Dutch painter

Willem van der Hagen
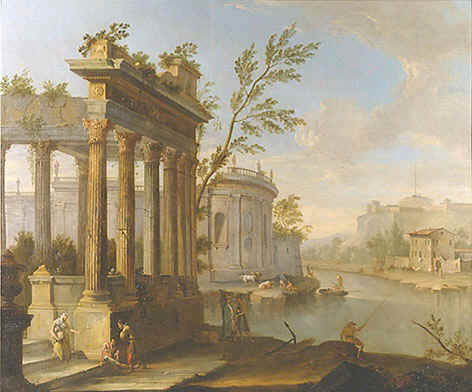
- A Capriccio Landscape with Figures and Classical Ruins by a River, oil on canvas — by Willem van der Hagen
- Died: 1745
- Known for: Painting
- Notable work: View of Drogheda 1718, View of Derry, c. 1728; State Ball in Dublin Castle, 1731; View of Waterford, c. 1736; He also painted a number of Capriccio Landscapes (for which he is possibly better esteemed).

Willem (or William) van der Hagen (died 1745) was a Dutch painter who settled in Ireland in the early 1720s, where he subsequently painted many works of art. He was also active in Europe and England prior to this. He is regarded by many as the founder of the Irish school of landscape painting.

== Personal life ==
Willem van der Hagen was born in the Netherlands, probably in The Hague. His exact date and place of birth are uncertain.

== Career ==
Van der Hagen first worked in Europe, where he painted views of a number of locations – including one of Gibraltar. He then settled in England, where he painted views of towns. However, he moved to Ireland in the early 1720s, although his first recorded painting was of Drogheda in 1718. He remained in Ireland the longest. He was one of Ireland's earliest landscape painters and is widely regarded as the founder of the Irish school of landscape painting.

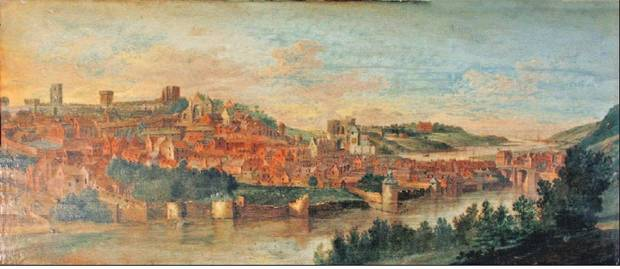
View of Drogheda by William van der Hagen

His painting titled View of Drogheda (1718) is probably his earliest work in Ireland. The painting is part of the Drogheda municipal collection on show in the town's Highlanes Gallery. He is recorded in Dublin in 1722 painting sets for the Theatre Royal, Dublin. He painted a State Ball in Dublin Castle in 1731 and a View of Waterford about 1736. The second of these was commissioned by Waterford Corporation, who paid £20 for it in 1736 – today, it is kept in Waterford City Hall. It is one of the earliest detailed views of an Irish city.

These views were followed in the 1730s by many capriccio landscapes.

One of Van der Hagen's paintings, titled Corke Harbour 1738, was auctioned in Cork on Wednesday, 11 February 2004. It obtained a price of €360,000. The painting is the oldest known surviving view of Cork Harbour.

== Bibliography ==
- Foster, R.F., ed. The Oxford Illustrated History of Ireland. UK: Oxford University Press, 1989 - 2000. ISBN 0-19-289323-8.
