= Civic Offices, Dungarvan =

Municipal building in County Waterford, Ireland

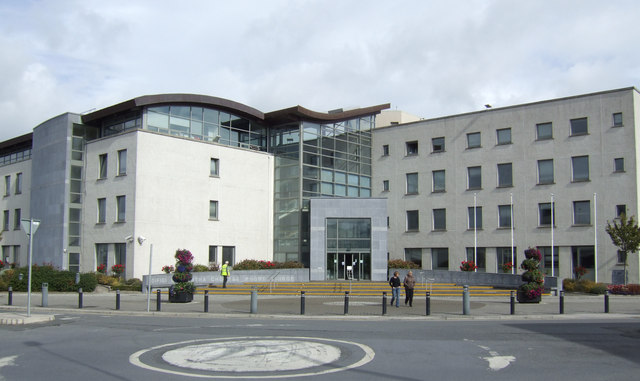
- Civic Offices

- Location within Ireland

General information
- Location: Dungarvan, County Waterford, Ireland
- Coordinates: 52.0922°N 7.6213°W
- Completed: 1999

The Civic Offices is a municipal facility at Davitt's Quay in Dungarvan, County Waterford, Ireland.

== History ==
Previously Waterford County Council had been based at Arus Brugha at Davitt's Quay. The county council moved to the new building, which cost €6 million to build, in April 1999. Some structural changes were carried out to the building following the merger of Waterford City Council and Waterford County Council to create Waterford City and County Council in 2014.
