= John Cummins (Irish politician) =

Irish politician (born 1988)

John Cummins TD
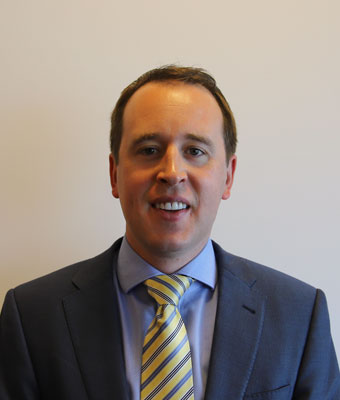
- Cummins in 2020

Minister of State
- 2025–: Housing, Local Government and Heritage

Teachta Dála
- Incumbent
- Assumed office November 2024
- Constituency: Waterford

Senator
- In office 29 June 2020 – 30 November 2024
- Constituency: Labour Panel

Personal details
- Born: 29 June 1987 (age 39) Waterford, Ireland
- Party: Fine Gael
- Parent: Maurice Cummins (father)
- Education: University of Limerick
- Website: johncumminswaterford.ie

John Cummins (born 29 June 1987) is an Irish Fine Gael politician who has served as Minister of State at the Department of Housing, Local Government and Heritage since January 2025 and a Teachta Dála (TD) for the Waterford constituency since the 2024 general election. He previously served as a Senator on the Labour Panel from 2020 to 2024.

== Personal life and career ==
He is married to Inga and they live in Waterford. Cummins has a degree in Physical Education and Geography Teaching from the University of Limerick. He has taught in a number of schools, including in St. Paul's Community College in Waterford city. He has been an active member of many sporting clubs, including De La Salle GAA Club, Hibernian FC and Faithlegg Golf club. He was also a member of the De La Salle Scout Group in Waterford and was a member of the team which won the national Scouting competition for the first time in that group's history in 2000. He also served as National Youth Representative in Scouting Ireland. His father is former Fine Gael senator Maurice Cummins.

== Political career ==
Cummins was elected to Waterford City Council in 2009. In 2010, he was elected as Chairman of the South East Regional Authority. He served his first term as Mayor of Waterford in 2013; at the age of 25, he was the youngest person ever to hold that office. He was subsequently re-elected to the amalgamated Waterford City and County Council in 2014, and served his second term as mayor from 2015 to 2016. He was re-elected to the council in 2019.

Cummins unsuccessfully contested the 2020 general election for the Waterford constituency. He was subsequently elected at the 2020 Seanad election as a senator for the Labour Panel.

He was appointed as the Fine Gael spokesperson on Housing, Local Government and Heritage by Leo Varadkar.

He lost the party whip in August 2020 following his involvement in the Oireachtas Golf Society scandal, which saw him allegedly breach public health guidelines with regard to COVID-19. The party whip was restored on 12 January 2021. All charges related to the event were later dismissed on 3 February 2022.

At the 2024 general election, Cummins was elected to the Dáil. He was a member of the Fine Gael programme for government negotiating team. On 29 January 2025, he was appointed as Minister of State at the Department of Housing, Local Government and Heritage with special responsibility for local government and planning.

Political offices
Preceded by Alan Dillon; Malcolm Noonan	Minister of State at the Department of Housing, Local Government and Heritage; 2025–present With: Christopher O'Sullivan; Kieran O'Donnell	Incumbent

Dáil	Election	Deputy (Party)	Deputy (Party)	Deputy (Party)	Deputy (Party)
4th	1923	Caitlín Brugha (Rep)	John Butler (Lab)	Nicholas Wall (FP)	William Redmond (NL)
5th	1927 (Jun)	Caitlín Brugha (Rep)	Patrick Little (FF)	Vincent White (CnaG)	William Redmond (NL)
6th	1927 (Sep)	Seán Goulding (FF)	Patrick Little (FF)	Vincent White (CnaG)	William Redmond (NL)
7th	1932	Seán Goulding (FF)	Patrick Little (FF)	John Kiersey (CnaG)	William Redmond (CnaG)
8th	1933	Seán Goulding (FF)	Patrick Little (FF)	Nicholas Wall (NCP)	Bridget Redmond (CnaG)
9th	1937	Michael Morrissey (FF)	Patrick Little (FF)	Nicholas Wall (FG)	Bridget Redmond (FG)
10th	1938	Michael Morrissey (FF)	Patrick Little (FF)	William Broderick (FG)	Bridget Redmond (FG)
11th	1943	Michael Morrissey (FF)	Patrick Little (FF)	Denis Heskin (CnaT)	Bridget Redmond (FG)
12th	1944	Michael Morrissey (FF)	Patrick Little (FF)	Denis Heskin (CnaT)	Bridget Redmond (FG)
12th	1947 by-election	John Ormonde (FF)	Patrick Little (FF)	Denis Heskin (CnaT)	Bridget Redmond (FG)
13th	1948	John Ormonde (FF)	Patrick Little (FF)	Thomas Kyne (Lab)	Bridget Redmond (FG)
14th	1951	John Ormonde (FF)	Patrick Little (FF)	Thomas Kyne (Lab)	Bridget Redmond (FG)
14th	1952 by-election	John Ormonde (FF)	Patrick Little (FF)	Thomas Kyne (Lab)	William Kenneally (FF)
15th	1954	John Ormonde (FF)	Thaddeus Lynch (FG)	Thomas Kyne (Lab)	William Kenneally (FF)
16th	1957	John Ormonde (FF)	Thaddeus Lynch (FG)	Thomas Kyne (Lab)	William Kenneally (FF)
17th	1961	John Ormonde (FF)	Thaddeus Lynch (FG)	Thomas Kyne (Lab)	3 seats 1961–1977
18th	1965	Billy Kenneally (FF)	Thaddeus Lynch (FG)	Thomas Kyne (Lab)	3 seats 1961–1977
18th	1966 by-election	Billy Kenneally (FF)	Fad Browne (FF)	Thomas Kyne (Lab)	3 seats 1961–1977
19th	1969	Billy Kenneally (FF)	Fad Browne (FF)	Edward Collins (FG)	3 seats 1961–1977
20th	1973	Billy Kenneally (FF)	Thomas Kyne (Lab)	Edward Collins (FG)	3 seats 1961–1977
21st	1977	Billy Kenneally (FF)	Jackie Fahey (FF)	Edward Collins (FG)	Austin Deasy (FG)
22nd	1981	Billy Kenneally (FF)	Jackie Fahey (FF)	Edward Collins (FG)	Austin Deasy (FG)
23rd	1982 (Feb)	Paddy Gallagher (SF–WP)	Jackie Fahey (FF)	Edward Collins (FG)	Austin Deasy (FG)
24th	1982 (Nov)	Donal Ormonde (FF)	Jackie Fahey (FF)	Edward Collins (FG)	Austin Deasy (FG)
25th	1987	Martin Cullen (PDs)	Jackie Fahey (FF)	Brian Swift (FF)	Austin Deasy (FG)
26th	1989	Brian O'Shea (Lab)	Jackie Fahey (FF)	Brendan Kenneally (FF)	Austin Deasy (FG)
27th	1992	Brian O'Shea (Lab)	Martin Cullen (PDs)	Brendan Kenneally (FF)	Austin Deasy (FG)
28th	1997	Brian O'Shea (Lab)	Martin Cullen (FF)	Brendan Kenneally (FF)	Austin Deasy (FG)
29th	2002	Brian O'Shea (Lab)	Martin Cullen (FF)	Ollie Wilkinson (FF)	John Deasy (FG)
30th	2007	Brian O'Shea (Lab)	Martin Cullen (FF)	Brendan Kenneally (FF)	John Deasy (FG)
31st	2011	Ciara Conway (Lab)	John Halligan (Ind.)	Paudie Coffey (FG)	John Deasy (FG)
32nd	2016	David Cullinane (SF)	John Halligan (Ind.)	Mary Butler (FF)	John Deasy (FG)
33rd	2020	David Cullinane (SF)	Marc Ó Cathasaigh (GP)	Mary Butler (FF)	Matt Shanahan (Ind.)
34th	2024	David Cullinane (SF)	Conor D. McGuinness (SF)	Mary Butler (FF)	John Cummins (FG)
