= 2009 Irish local elections =

Nationwide local authority elections

- 5 June 2009

883 County and City Council seats; 744 Borough and Town Council seats
- Turnout: 57.77% ▼0.87pp
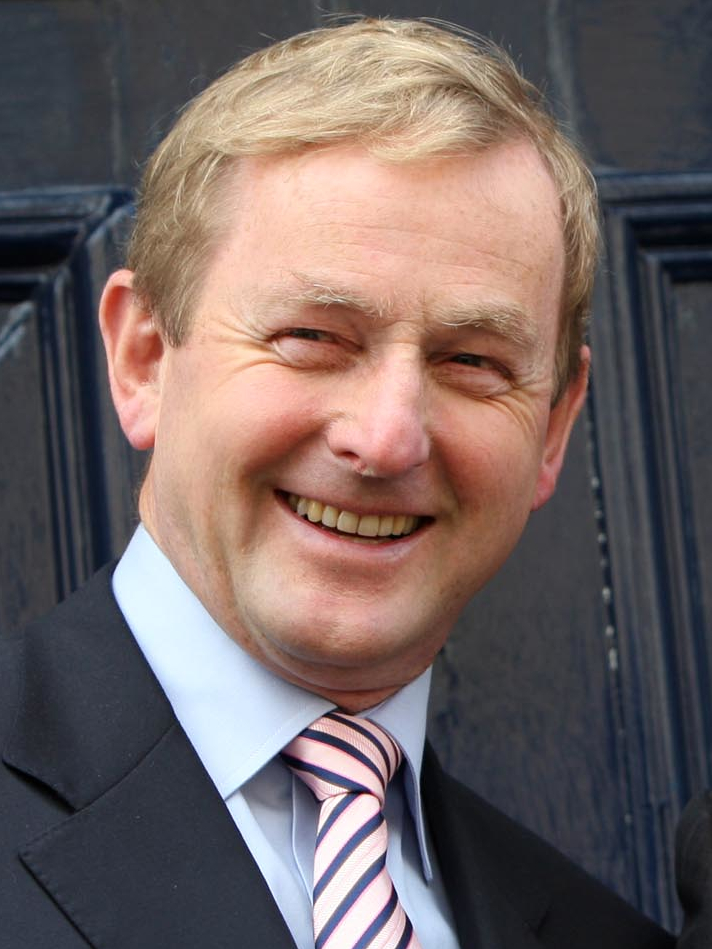

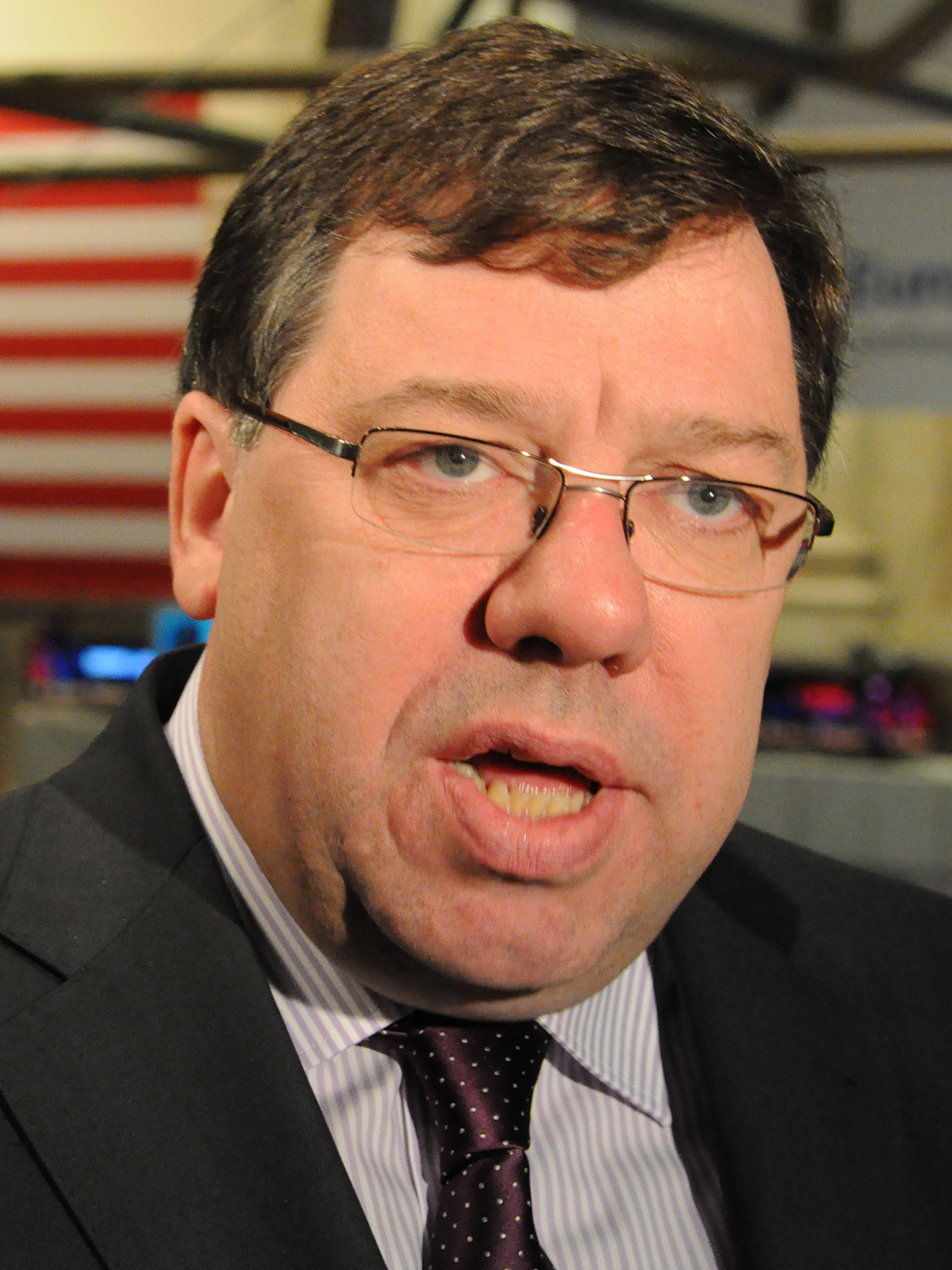

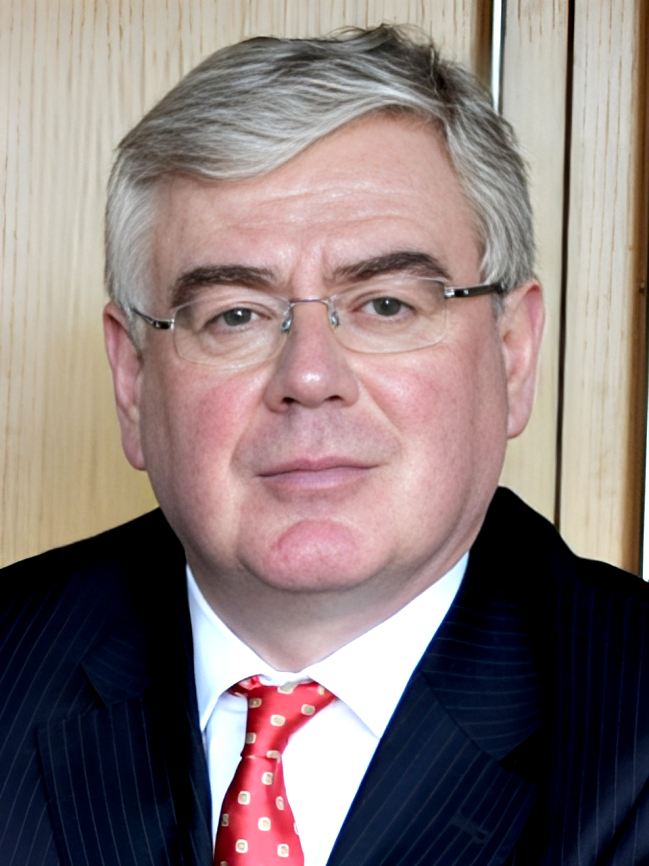

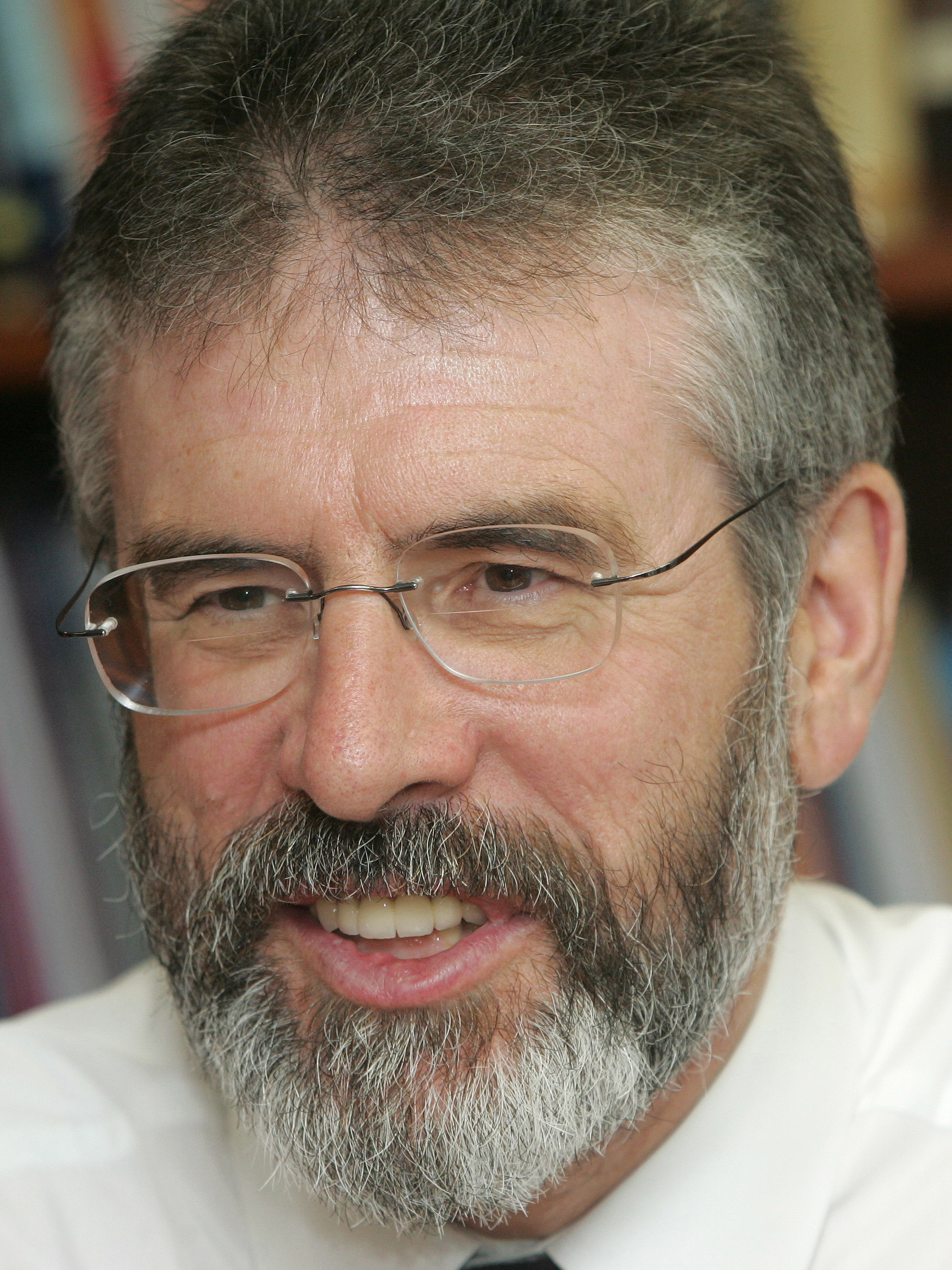

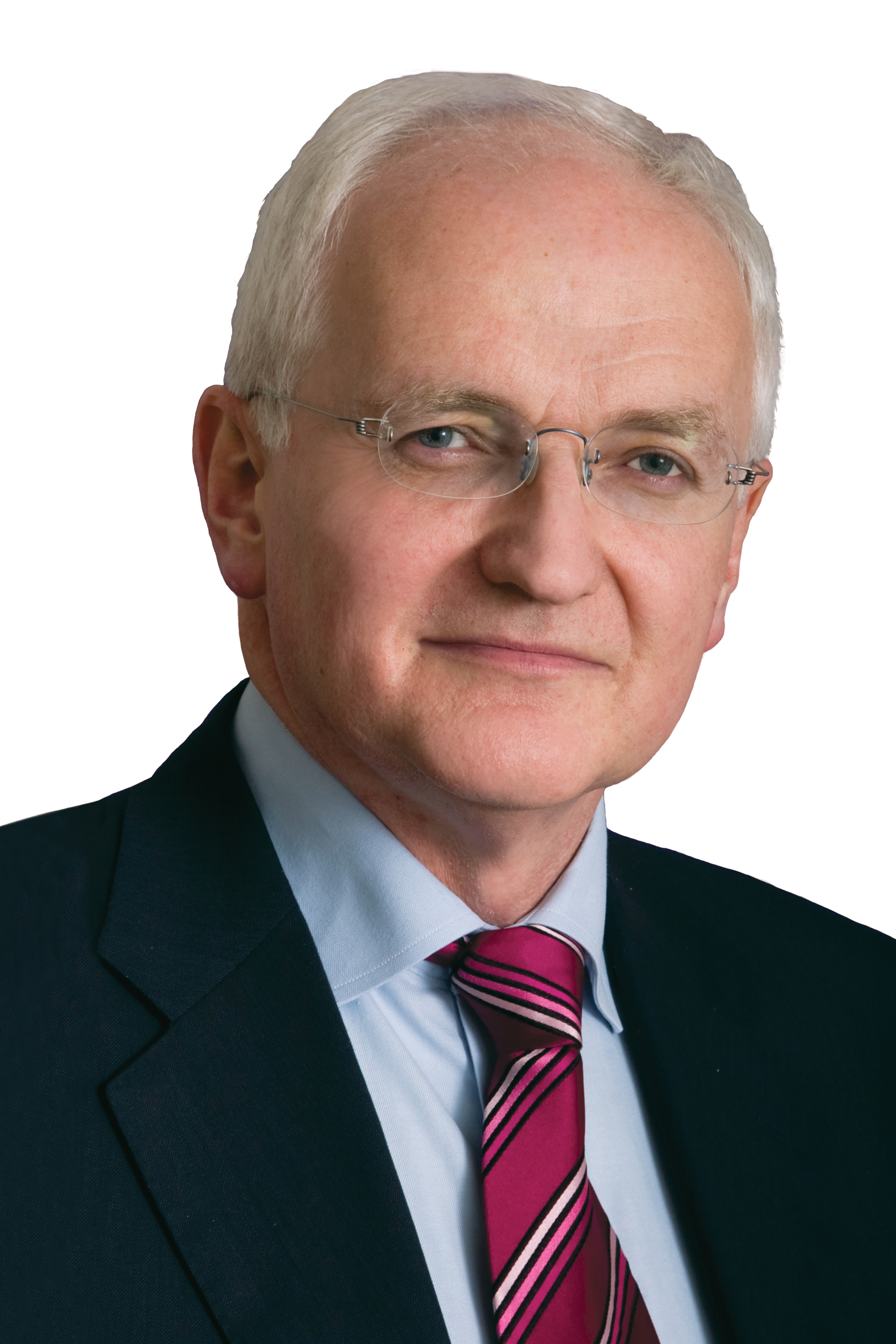

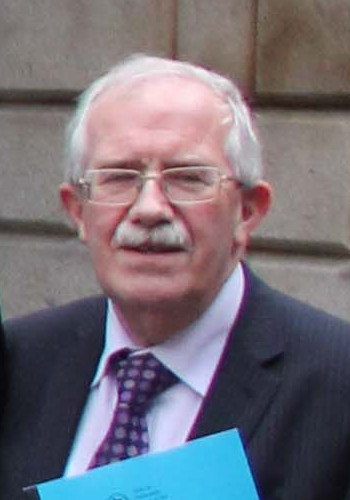
	First party	Second party	Third party
Leader	Enda Kenny	Brian Cowen	Eamon Gilmore
Party	Fine Gael	Fianna Fáil	Labour
Leader since	6 June 2002	7 May 2008	6 September 2007
Percentage	32.2%	25.4%	14.7%
Largest Party	24	3	4
Councillors	556 (340 C&C, 216 B&T)	407 (218 C&C, 189 B&T)	231 (132 C&C, 99 B&T)
Councillors +/-	▲88	▼135	▲43
	Fourth party	Fifth party	Sixth party
Leader	Gerry Adams	John Gormley	Séamus Healy
Party	Sinn Féin	Green	Workers and Unemployed
Leader since	13 November 1983	17 July 2007	1997
Percentage	7.4%	2.3%	0.2%
Largest Party	1	N/A	N/A
Councillors	127 (54 C&C, 73 B&T)	18 (3 C&C, 15 B&T)	7 (2 C&C, 5 B&T)
Councillors +/-	▲2	▼14	▲5

The 2009 Irish local elections were held in all the counties, cities and towns of Ireland on Friday, 5 June 2009, on the same day as the European Parliament election and two by-elections (Dublin South and Dublin Central).

== Overview ==
The election results were significant for a number of reasons:

- Fine Gael gained 88 seats and became the largest party at local level for the first time ever.
- Fianna Fáil lost 135 seats and became the second-largest party nationally, and the third-largest in Dublin.
- The Labour Party increased its seat total by 43 seats, and became the largest party on Dublin City Council. It also held the most seats on the four Dublin local authorities.
- Sinn Féin support remained at almost the same level, gaining 2 seats.
- The Green Party lost 14 seats and had 3 county councillors.
- The People Before Profit Alliance won 5 seats in its first local elections.
- The Socialist Party won 6 seats, a gain of 2 seats.

== Results ==
The total number of the Irish electorate eligible to vote in the election was 3,259,253. A total of 1,880,589 first preference votes were cast, representing a turnout of 57.7%.

The Progressive Democrats and Independent Fianna Fáil did not compete in the elections. As they competed in the previous elections, totals for vote and seat changes may not total zero. People Before Profit Alliance figures are compared to Socialist Workers Party figures from the previous local elections.

=== All councils ===
Party	County	City	Borough	Town	Total	±
Fine Gael	305	35	16	200	556	+88
Fianna Fáil	201	17	11	178	407	–135
Labour	94	38	13	86	231	+43
Sinn Féin	41	13	8	65	127	+2
Green	3	0	2	13	18	–14
Workers and Unemployed	2	0	4	1	7	+5
Socialist Party	3	1	1	1	6	+2
People Before Profit	3	2	0	0	5	+5
Workers' Party	0	2	0	0	2	+0
SKIA	1	0	0	1	2	–
Letterkenny Residents Party	0	0	0	1	1	New
Independent	102	22	10	141	275	+10
Total	753	130	60	684	1,627	—

=== County and city councils ===
Posters for local and European election candidates and parties, Dublin, May 2009

Party	Seats	±	1st pref	FPv%	±%
Fine Gael	340	+47	605,333	32.2	+4.6
Fianna Fáil	218	–84	477,342	25.4	–6.4
Labour	132	+31	276,627	14.7	+3.3
Sinn Féin	54	Steady	138,405	7.4	–0.6
People Before Profit	5	+5	15,879	0.8	+0.5
Socialist Party	4	Steady	16,052	0.9	+0.2
Green	3	–15	44,152	2.3	–1.6
Workers' Party	2	Steady	4,771	0.3	+0.1
Workers and Unemployed	2	Steady	3,590	0.2	
SKIA	1	Steady	2,536	0.1	—
Seniors Solidarity	0	Steady	1,319	0.1	New
Christian Solidarity	0	Steady	467	0.0	—
Independent	122	+37	294,094	15.6	+4.5
Total	883	—	1,880,589	—	—

==== Detailed results ====
Authority	FG	FF	Lab	SF	PBP	SP	GP	WUA	WP	SKIA	Ind.	Total	Details
Carlow	10	4	5								2	21	Details
Cavan	13	8		4								25	Details
Clare	12	11	1				1				7	32	Details
Cork	22	12	7	1							6	48	Details
Cork City	8	6	7	4		1			1		4	31	Details
Donegal	8	10	2	4							5	29	Details
Dublin City	12	6	19	7	2						6	52	Details
Dún Laoghaire–Rathdown	11	4	8		2						3	28	Details
Fingal	6	4	9			3					2	24	Details
Galway	13	7	1	1							8 (Note: Includes Tomás Ó Curraoin of Republican Sinn Féin, which is an unregistered party.)	30	Details
Galway City	3	3	5								4	15	Details
Kerry	10	7	4	2						1	3	27	Details
Kildare	9	6	6								4	25	Details
Kilkenny	12	7	5				1				1	26	Details
Laois	12	8	1	1							3	25	Details
Leitrim	10	8		2							2	22	Details
Limerick	15	9	2								2	28	Details
Limerick City	8	1	4	1							3	17	Details
Longford	10	8									3	21	Details
Louth	8	5	2	6			1				4	26	Details
Mayo	17	7		2							5	31	Details
Meath	11	8	4	1							5	29	Details
Monaghan	6	5		7							2	20	Details
North Tipperary	4	6	3	1							7 (Note: Michael Lowry's organisation has 4 County Councillors in North Tipperary, 2 Town Councillors in Thurles and 1 Town Councillor in Templemore.)	21	Details
Offaly	6	9									6	21	Details
Roscommon	10	8		1							7	26	Details
Sligo	12	7	2	1							3	25	Details
South Dublin	8	4	9	3	1						1	26	Details
South Tipperary	12	6	3					2			3	26	Details
Waterford	11	5	4	2							1	23	Details
Waterford City	4	1	3	1					1		5	15	Details
Westmeath	8	9	6									23	Details
Wexford	10	5	4								2	21	Details
Wicklow	9	4	6	2							3	24	Details
Total	340	218	132	54	5	4	3	2	2	1	122	883	

Following the June 2009 local elections Fine Gael were the largest political party on 24 councils, the Labour Party on 4 councils, Fianna Fáil on 3 councils, Independents on 2 councils and Sinn Féin on 1 council.

=== Borough and town councils ===
Party	Seats	±
Fine Gael	216	▲44
Fianna Fáil	189	▼53
Labour	99	▲12
Sinn Féin	73	▲2
Green	15	▲1
Workers and Unemployed	5	Steady
SKIA	1	Steady
Letterkenny Residents Party	1	▲1
Independent	144	▼7

==== Detailed results ====
The five councils with the status of borough councils are marked as BC. All others are town councils.

Town	FG	Lab	FF	SF	GP	WUA	SKIA	Oth	Total
Ardee	2	2	1	1	1			2	9
Arklow	3	1	2					3	9
Athlone	3	3	1	1				1	9
Athy	1	2	4	1				1	9
Balbriggan	1	1	3		1			3	9
Ballina	3	3						3	9
Ballinasloe	2	3		1				3	9
Ballybay	4	4		1					9
Ballyshannon	2	5		1				1	9
Bandon	4	3	1	1					9
Bantry	5	3						1	9
Belturbet	1	3						5	9
Birr	4	2						3	9
Boyle	2	4		1				2	9
Bray	2	3	3	2	1			1	12
Buncrana	2	3		2				2	9
Bundoran	3	2		2				2	9
Carlow	3	3	1	1				1	9
Carrickmacross	2	3		2	2				9
Carrick-on-Suir	2	1	1	1		1		3	9
Cashel	2	2		1				4	9
Castlebar	1	4	1	1				2	9
Castleblayney	3	2		3				1	9
Cavan	3	4	1	1					9
Clonakilty	2	2	1	1				3	9
Clones	2	2		3				2	9
Clonmel BC	2	2	2			4		2	12
Cobh	1	2	3	1				2	9
Cootehill	3	3		2				1	9
Drogheda BC	4	2	1	3				2	12
Dundalk	3	2		3	2			2	12
Dungarvan	2	3	3	1					9
Edenderry	3	2	1					3	9
Ennis	1	3	1		1			3	9
Enniscorthy	2	2	1	1				3	9
Fermoy	2	2	2	1				2	9
Gorey	4	4	1						9
Granard	3	2	1					3	9
Greystones	2	4	2					1	9
Kells	3	2	2	1				1	9
Kilkee	4	4						1	9
Kilkenny BC	4	2	4	1	1				12
Killarney	2	1	2				1	3	9
Kilrush	3	3						3	9
Kinsale	2	2	2	1	1			1	9
Leixlip	1	3	2		1			2	9
Letterkenny	4	1		1				3	9
Lismore	3	3	1					2	9
Listowel	3	4		2					9
Longford	2	3						4	9
Loughrea	3	2						4	9
Macroom	3	4	2						9
Mallow	1	2	4	1				1	9
Midleton	1	2	1	1				4	9
Monaghan	1	3		4				1	9
Mountmellick	3	3	1	1				1	9
Muine Bheag	3	3	2					1	9
Mullingar	3	2	4						9
Naas	1	3	2					3	9
Navan	4	2		2				1	9
Nenagh	2	2	2	1				2	9
Newbridge	2	2	2					3	9
New Ross	3	2	2	1 (Note: John Dwyer resigned from Sinn Féin and changed designation to Non-Party before the first meeting of New Ross Town Council.)	1				9
Passage West	2	3		1				3	9
Portlaoise	2	3		2				2	9
Shannon		4	2	1				2	9
Skibbereen	2	4	2	1					9
Sligo BC	3	3	2	3				1	
Templemore	3	3						3	9
Thurles	1	1	2	1				4	9
Tipperary	3	1	1					4	9
Tralee	2	3	3	2				1	12
Tramore	1	4	1					3	9
Trim	2	3	2					2	9
Tuam	3	2	2					2	9
Tullamore	4	2	2	1					9
Westport	2	5	1					1	9
Wexford BC	3	4	2	1	1			1	12
Wicklow	1	3	1	1	1			2	9
Youghal	3	2	1	2	1				9
Total	216	189	99	73	15	5	1	145	744
