= James Aloysius Power =

Irish businessperson (1865–1921)

Sir James Aloysius Power (17 April 1865 – 19 May 1921) was an Irish businessman who was the Mayor of Waterford from 1903–5. He received his knighthood on 2 May 1904 at Waterford's South Railway Station from King Edward VII who had traveled from Dún Laoghaire to Waterford North Station which had been decked out in crimson. HMS Aeolous fired a salute and Power hosted the King at a City Hall reception. Power was knighted just before the King left on the train station platform.

Power was born in Waterford, the third son of James Power, who owned a leather store. Power took over the business and expanded it into a drapery.
