= Conor D. McGuinness =

Irish politician

Conor D. McGuinness TD
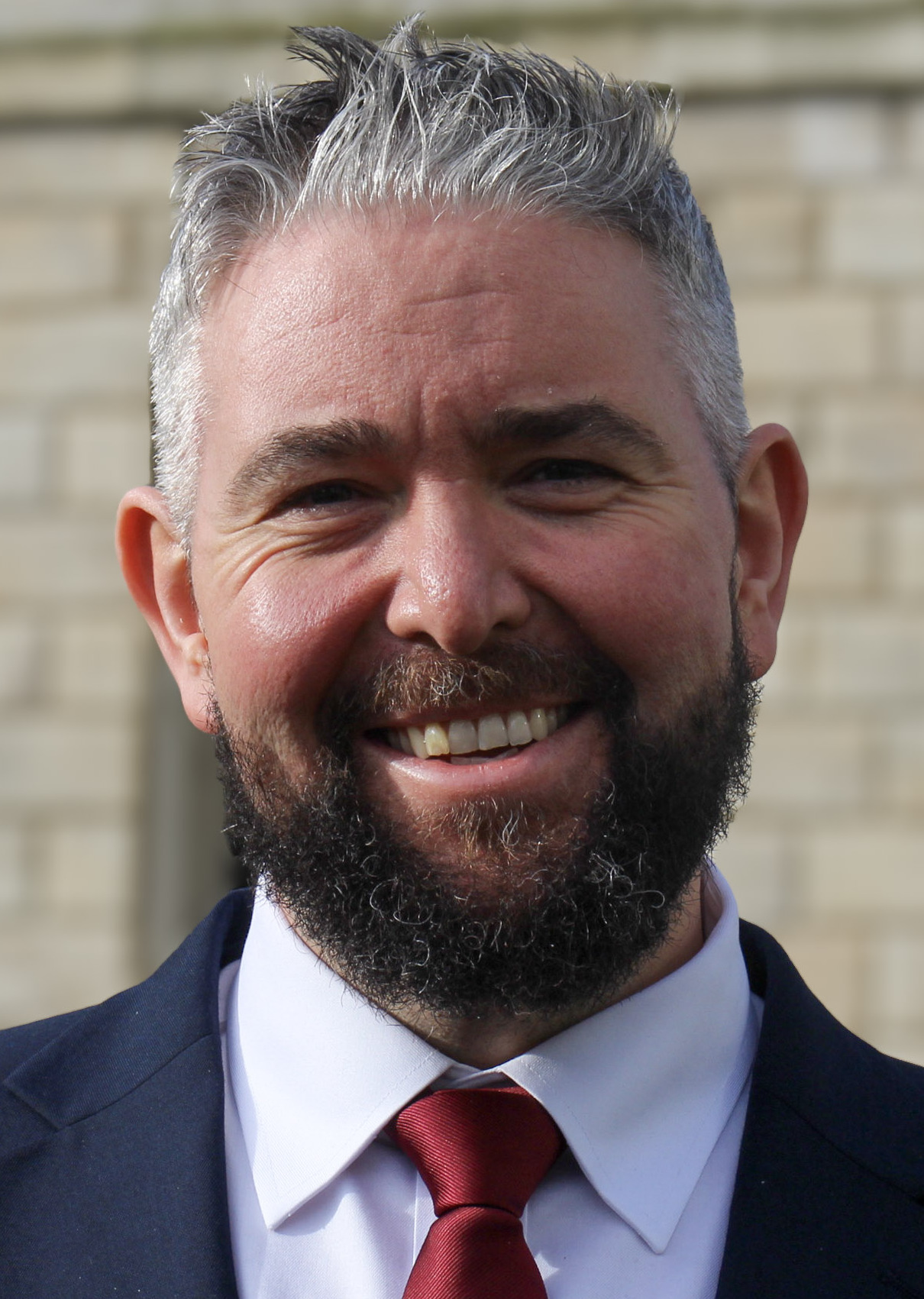
- McGuiness in 2026

Teachta Dála
- Incumbent
- Assumed office November 2024
- Constituency: Waterford

Personal details
- Born: 1985/1986 (age 39–40)
- Party: Sinn Féin
- Spouse: Pia McGuinness
- Education: University of Galway
- Website: conormcguinness.ie

Conor D. McGuinness (born 1985/1986) is an Irish Sinn Féin politician who has been a Teachta Dála (TD) for the Waterford constituency since the 2024 general election.

McGuinness is the Sinn Féin spokesperson on Rural Affairs, Community Development and An Ghaeltacht. He was appointed as chairperson of the Oireachtas Committee on Fisheries and Maritime Affairs in April 2025.

== Background ==
McGuinness is an Irish speaker who lives in the Waterford Gaeltacht.

He is a trade unionist with Unite the Union in Dungarvan, having served on its youth committee until 2017. He was also a founding member of Laochas, a youth mental health organisation in Waterford, and was also involved with Dungarvan's credit union. He has an MA degree from the University of Galway.

According to his website, McGuinness is a Peace Commissioner for Waterford and adjoining counties.

He was a board member and vice-chairperson of Foras na Gaeilge and previously worked as the language planning officer for Gaeltacht na nDéise.

== Political career ==
McGuinness joined Sinn Féin in 2001 at the age of 15.

He was elected to Waterford City and County Council representing Dungarvan / Lismore in the 2019 Irish local elections. He was re-elected in the 2024 Irish local elections having almost doubled his previous vote.

McGuinness served as part of Ireland's delegation on the European Committee of the Regions from 2020, and as a member of the Southern Regional Assembly. As of 2023, he was a member of Sinn Féin's Ard Chomhairle, the party's central decision-making body.

McGuinness was elected to the Dáil for the Waterford constituency at the 2024 general election.

== Political views ==
The Phoenix, described McGuinness in 2023 as an "old-school republican".

Dáil	Election	Deputy (Party)	Deputy (Party)	Deputy (Party)	Deputy (Party)
4th	1923	Caitlín Brugha (Rep)	John Butler (Lab)	Nicholas Wall (FP)	William Redmond (NL)
5th	1927 (Jun)	Caitlín Brugha (Rep)	Patrick Little (FF)	Vincent White (CnaG)	William Redmond (NL)
6th	1927 (Sep)	Seán Goulding (FF)	Patrick Little (FF)	Vincent White (CnaG)	William Redmond (NL)
7th	1932	Seán Goulding (FF)	Patrick Little (FF)	John Kiersey (CnaG)	William Redmond (CnaG)
8th	1933	Seán Goulding (FF)	Patrick Little (FF)	Nicholas Wall (NCP)	Bridget Redmond (CnaG)
9th	1937	Michael Morrissey (FF)	Patrick Little (FF)	Nicholas Wall (FG)	Bridget Redmond (FG)
10th	1938	Michael Morrissey (FF)	Patrick Little (FF)	William Broderick (FG)	Bridget Redmond (FG)
11th	1943	Michael Morrissey (FF)	Patrick Little (FF)	Denis Heskin (CnaT)	Bridget Redmond (FG)
12th	1944	Michael Morrissey (FF)	Patrick Little (FF)	Denis Heskin (CnaT)	Bridget Redmond (FG)
12th	1947 by-election	John Ormonde (FF)	Patrick Little (FF)	Denis Heskin (CnaT)	Bridget Redmond (FG)
13th	1948	John Ormonde (FF)	Patrick Little (FF)	Thomas Kyne (Lab)	Bridget Redmond (FG)
14th	1951	John Ormonde (FF)	Patrick Little (FF)	Thomas Kyne (Lab)	Bridget Redmond (FG)
14th	1952 by-election	John Ormonde (FF)	Patrick Little (FF)	Thomas Kyne (Lab)	William Kenneally (FF)
15th	1954	John Ormonde (FF)	Thaddeus Lynch (FG)	Thomas Kyne (Lab)	William Kenneally (FF)
16th	1957	John Ormonde (FF)	Thaddeus Lynch (FG)	Thomas Kyne (Lab)	William Kenneally (FF)
17th	1961	John Ormonde (FF)	Thaddeus Lynch (FG)	Thomas Kyne (Lab)	3 seats 1961–1977
18th	1965	Billy Kenneally (FF)	Thaddeus Lynch (FG)	Thomas Kyne (Lab)	3 seats 1961–1977
18th	1966 by-election	Billy Kenneally (FF)	Fad Browne (FF)	Thomas Kyne (Lab)	3 seats 1961–1977
19th	1969	Billy Kenneally (FF)	Fad Browne (FF)	Edward Collins (FG)	3 seats 1961–1977
20th	1973	Billy Kenneally (FF)	Thomas Kyne (Lab)	Edward Collins (FG)	3 seats 1961–1977
21st	1977	Billy Kenneally (FF)	Jackie Fahey (FF)	Edward Collins (FG)	Austin Deasy (FG)
22nd	1981	Billy Kenneally (FF)	Jackie Fahey (FF)	Edward Collins (FG)	Austin Deasy (FG)
23rd	1982 (Feb)	Paddy Gallagher (SF–WP)	Jackie Fahey (FF)	Edward Collins (FG)	Austin Deasy (FG)
24th	1982 (Nov)	Donal Ormonde (FF)	Jackie Fahey (FF)	Edward Collins (FG)	Austin Deasy (FG)
25th	1987	Martin Cullen (PDs)	Jackie Fahey (FF)	Brian Swift (FF)	Austin Deasy (FG)
26th	1989	Brian O'Shea (Lab)	Jackie Fahey (FF)	Brendan Kenneally (FF)	Austin Deasy (FG)
27th	1992	Brian O'Shea (Lab)	Martin Cullen (PDs)	Brendan Kenneally (FF)	Austin Deasy (FG)
28th	1997	Brian O'Shea (Lab)	Martin Cullen (FF)	Brendan Kenneally (FF)	Austin Deasy (FG)
29th	2002	Brian O'Shea (Lab)	Martin Cullen (FF)	Ollie Wilkinson (FF)	John Deasy (FG)
30th	2007	Brian O'Shea (Lab)	Martin Cullen (FF)	Brendan Kenneally (FF)	John Deasy (FG)
31st	2011	Ciara Conway (Lab)	John Halligan (Ind.)	Paudie Coffey (FG)	John Deasy (FG)
32nd	2016	David Cullinane (SF)	John Halligan (Ind.)	Mary Butler (FF)	John Deasy (FG)
33rd	2020	David Cullinane (SF)	Marc Ó Cathasaigh (GP)	Mary Butler (FF)	Matt Shanahan (Ind.)
34th	2024	David Cullinane (SF)	Conor D. McGuinness (SF)	Mary Butler (FF)	John Cummins (FG)
