= Waterford County Council =

Former local authority for County Waterford in Ireland (1899–2014)

Waterford County Council Comhairle Contae Phort Láirge

Type
- Type: County council

History
- Established: 1 April 1899
- Disbanded: 1 June 2014
- Preceded by: Grand Jury
- Succeeded by: Waterford City and County Council

Elections
- Last election: 5 June 2009

Motto
- Irish: Déisi oc Declán co Bráth "May the Déise remain with Declan forever"

Meeting place
- Civic Offices, Dungarvan

The area governed by the council

Waterford County Council (Irish: Comhairle Contae Phort Láirge) was the local authority of County Waterford, Ireland. The remit of Waterford County Council included some suburbs of the city of Waterford not within the jurisdiction of Waterford City Council. As a county council, it was governed by the Local Government Act 2001.

When disestablished in 2014, the council was responsible for housing and community, roads and transportation, urban planning and development, amenity and culture, and environment. It had 23 elected members. Elections were held every five years and were by single transferable vote. The head of the council had the title of Cathaoirleach. The county administration was headed by a County Manager. The county town was Dungarvan.

== Establishment ==
Waterford County Council was established on 1 April 1899 under the Local Government (Ireland) Act 1898 for the administrative county of County Waterford. It succeeded the judicial county of Waterford, with the exception of the district electoral division of Kilculliheen, which became part of County Kilkenny, and the portions of Carrick-on-Suir and Clonmel, which became part of South Tipperary.

It took over the administrative business until then dealt with by the county grand jury, such as the maintenance of highways and bridges, the upkeep and inspection of lunatic asylums, and the appointment of coroners. The new county council also took over some duties of the poor law boards of guardians and of the justices of the peace to regulate explosives.

The county was divided by the Local Government Board for Ireland into district electoral divisions, each returning one councillor for a three-year term. The urban district of Waterford also elected county councillors, and "additional members" included the chairman of each rural district in the county, unless already elected or disqualified, when the RDC was to appoint another member. The council could also co-opt one or two additional members for a three-year term.

The first county council elections were held on 6 April 1899, and the first business was to appoint additional members. Waterford County Council held its first meeting in Waterford Courthouse, but agreed that later meetings would be held at Dungarvan Courthouse.

The county council established a County Secretary's Office at Arus Brugha at Davitt's Quay in the early-20th century before moving into the modern Civic Offices, Dungarvan, at Davitt's Quay in 1999.

The triennial elections were postponed in 1914, on the outbreak of the First World War.

== Elections ==
The Local Government (Ireland) Act 1919 introduced the electoral system of proportional representation by means of the single transferable vote (PR-STV) for the 1920 Irish local elections, held in January 1920 (in urban areas) and on 2 June 1920 (in rural areas), during the Irish War of Independence. County Waterford was divided into 4 county electoral areas to elect the 20 members of the council.

Under the Local Government Act 2001, Waterford County Council was allocated 23 seats. The 2009 Waterford County Council election was the last election to the council.

== Dissolution ==
In late 2012, the Minister for the Environment, Community and Local Government Phil Hogan announced the proposed merger of Waterford County Council and Waterford City Council. Following implementation of the Local Government Reform Act 2014, it was dissolved on 1 June 2014, and succeeded by Waterford City and County Council.
