= Waterford City and County Council =

Local authority Waterford City and County, Ireland

Waterford City and County Council Comhairle Cathrach agus Contae Phort Láirge

Type
- Type: City and County council

History
- Founded: 1 June 2014

Leadership
- Mayor: Liam Brazil, FG

Structure
- Seats: 32
- Political groups: Fine Gael (8) Sinn Féin (7) Fianna Fáil (5) Labour (3) Social Democrats (1) Independent (8)

Elections
- Last election: 7 June 2024

Meeting place
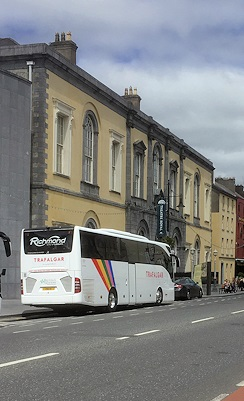
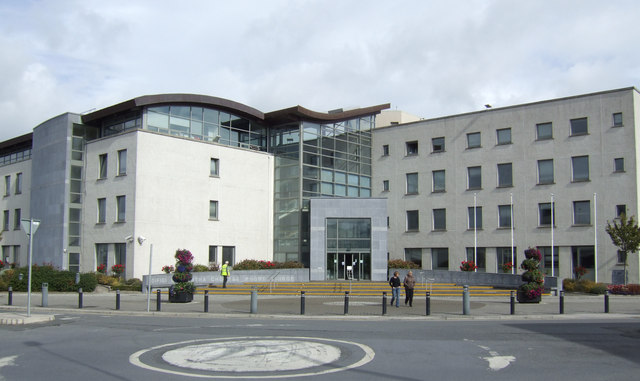
- City Hall, Waterford (top) and Civic Offices, Dungarvan (bottom)
- City Hall, Waterford; Civic Offices, Dungarvan

Website
- Official website

The area governed by the council

Waterford City and County Council (Irish: Comhairle Cathrach agus Contae Phort Láirge) is the local authority of the City of Waterford and County Waterford in Ireland. It came into operation on 1 June 2014 after the 2014 local elections. It is a merger of Waterford City Council and Waterford County Council under the provisions of the Local Government Reform Act 2014. As a city and county council, it is governed by the Local Government Act 2001. The council is responsible for housing and community, roads and transportation, urban planning and development, amenities, arts and culture, and environment.

The council has 32 elected members. Elections are held every five years and are by single transferable vote. The head of the council has the title of Mayor. The city and county administration is headed by a chief executive, Seán McKeown. The administrative centres are Waterford and Dungarvan.

== Regional Assembly ==
Waterford City and County Council has two representatives on the Southern Regional Assembly who are part of the South-East Strategic Planning Area Committee.

== Elections ==
Members of Waterford City and County Council are elected for a five-year term of office on the electoral system of proportional representation by means of the single transferable vote (PR-STV) from multi-member local electoral areas.

| Year | FG | FF | SF | Lab | GP | SD | Ind. | Total |
| 2024 | 8 | 5 | 7 | 3 | 0 | 1 | 8 | 32 |
| 2019 | 7 | 7 | 6 | 4 | 2 | 0 | 6 | 32 |
| 2014 | 8 | 8 | 6 | 1 | 0 | 0 | 9 | 32 |

== Local electoral areas and municipal districts ==
The City and County of Waterford is divided into the metropolitan and municipal districts and local electoral areas, defined by electoral divisions. The municipal district which contains the administrative area of the former Waterford City Council is referred to as a Metropolitan District.

| Municipal District | LEA | Definition | Seats |
|---|---|---|---|
| Metropolitan District of Waterford City | Tramore–Waterford City West | Islandikane, Killoteran, Pembrokestown, Tramore; and the electoral divisions of Ballybricken, Bilberry, Centre A, Centre B, Cleaboy, Custom House B, Ferrybank, Gracedieu, Military Road, Newports Square, Shortcourse and The Glen, as specified in the Waterford County Borough (Wards) Regulations 1983 | 6 |
| Metropolitan District of Waterford City | Waterford City East | Ballynakill (in the former Rural District of Waterford No. 1), Faithlegg (Part), Killea, Kilmacleague, Rathmoylan, Woodstown;and the electoral divisions of Ballymaclode, Ballynakill (part), Farranshoneen, Grange South, Grange Upper, Newtown and Park, as specified in the Waterford County Borough (Wards) Regulations 1983 | 6 |
| Metropolitan District of Waterford City | Waterford City South | Drumcannon, Kilbarry (Part) (in the former Rural District of Waterford No. 1);and the electoral divisions of Ballybeg North, Ballybeg South, Ballynaneashagh, Ballytruckle, Custom House A, Grange North, Kilbarry, Kingsmeadow, Larchville, Lisduggan, Morrissons Avenue East, Morrissons Avenue West, Morrissons Road, Mount Sion, Poleberry, Roanmore, Slievekeale, Ticor North and Ticor South, as specified in the Waterford County Borough (Wards) Regulations 1983 | 6 |
| Dungarvan–Lismore | Dungarvan | Aird Mhór (in the former Rural District of Dungarvan), An Rinn, Ardmore (in the former Rural District of Youghal No. 2), Baile Mhac Airt, Ballyheeny, Bohadoon, Cappagh, Carriglea, Clashmore, Clonea (in the former Rural District of Dungarvan), Colligan, Dromore, Dungarvan No. 1 Urban, Dungarvan No. 2 Urban, Dungarvan Rural, Glenwilliam, Grallagh, Grange, Keereen, Kinsalebeg, Mountkennedy, Mountstuart and Whitechurch. | 6 |
| Dungarvan–Lismore | Lismore | Ballyduff, Ballyhane, Ballyin, Ballynamult, Ballysaggartmore, Cappoquin, Castlerichard, Dromana, Drumroe, Gortnapeaky, Graignagower, Kilcockan, Kilwatermoy East, Kilwatermoy West, Lismore Rural, Lismore Urban, Mocollop, Modelligo (in the former Rural District of Dungarvan), Modelligo (in the former Rural District of Lismore), Seskinan, Tallow and Templemichael. | 3 |
| Comeragh | Portlaw–Kilmacthomas | Annestown, Ballydurn, Ballylaneen, Ballymacarbry, Carrickbeg Rural, Carrigcastle, Clonea (in the former Rural District of Carrick-on-Suir No. 2), Comeragh, Coumaraglin, Dunhill, Fenoagh, Fews, Foxs Castle, Gardenmorris, Georgestown, Glen, Gurteen, Kilbarrymeaden, Kilmacomma, Kilmacthomas, Kilmeadan (in the former Rural District of Carrick-on-Suir No. 2), Kilmeadan (in the former Rural District of Waterford No. 1), Kilronan, Knockaunbrandaun, Knockmahon, Mothel, Newcastle, Newtown (in the former Rural District of Kilmacthomas), Portlaw, Rathgormuck, Reisk, Ross, St. Marys, Stradbally and Tinnasaggart. | 5 |

== Councillors ==
The following were elected at the 2024 Waterford City and County Council election.

=== 2024 seats summary ===
| Party | Seats |
|---|---|
| Fine Gael | 8 |
| Sinn Féin | 7 |
| Fianna Fáil | 5 |
| Labour | 3 |
| Social Democrats | 1 |
| Independent | 8 |

=== Councillors by electoral area ===
This list reflects the order in which councillors were elected on 7 June 2024.

Council members from 2024 election
| Local electoral area | Name | Party |
|---|---|---|
| Dungarvan | Damien Geoghegan | Fine Gael |
| Dungarvan | Conor D. McGuinness (Note: Replaced during term, see table below for details.) | Sinn Féin |
| Dungarvan | Tom Cronin | Fianna Fáil |
| Dungarvan | Pat Nugent | Fine Gael |
| Dungarvan | Thomas Phelan | Labour |
| Dungarvan | Joe O'Riordan | Independent |
| Lismore | John Pratt | Labour |
| Lismore | Niamh O'Donovan | Fine Gael |
| Lismore | Donnchadh Mulcahy | Sinn Féin |
| Portlaw–Kilmacthomas | Liam Brazil | Fine Gael |
| Portlaw–Kilmacthomas | Seánie Power | Fine Gael |
| Portlaw–Kilmacthomas | John O'Leary | Fianna Fáil |
| Portlaw–Kilmacthomas | Declan Clune | Independent |
| Portlaw–Kilmacthomas | Catherine Burke | Sinn Féin |
| Tramore–Waterford City West | Lola O'Sullivan | Fine Gael |
| Tramore–Waterford City West | Joe Kelly | Independent |
| Tramore–Waterford City West | Blaise Hannigan | Independent |
| Tramore–Waterford City West | Joe Conway | Independent |
| Tramore–Waterford City West | Jim Griffin | Sinn Féin |
| Tramore–Waterford City West | Éamon Quinlan | Fianna Fáil |
| Waterford City East | David Daniels | Independent |
| Waterford City East | Declan Barry | Independent |
| Waterford City East | Pat Fitzgerald | Sinn Féin |
| Waterford City East | Adam Wyse | Fianna Fáil |
| Waterford City East | Jim D'arcy | Fine Gael |
| Waterford City East | Mary Roche | Social Democrats |
| Waterford City South | Donal Barry | Independent |
| Waterford City South | John Hearne | Sinn Féin |
| Waterford City South | Jason Murphy | Fianna Fáil |
| Waterford City South | Joeanne Bailey | Sinn Féin |
| Waterford City South | Frank Quinlan | Fine Gael |
| Waterford City South | Séamus Ryan | Labour |

==== Co-options ====
| Party | Outgoing | LEA | Reason | Date | Co-optee |
|---|---|---|---|---|---|
| Sinn Féin | Conor D. McGuinness | Dungarvan | Elected to 34th Dáil at the 2024 general election | 16 December 2024 | Kate O'Mahoney |
| Independent | Joe Conway | Tramore–Waterford City West | Elected to 27th Seanad at the 2025 Seanad election | 14 March 2025 | Sandra Conway |
