= Joe Conway (Irish politician) =

Irish politician

Senator Joe Conway
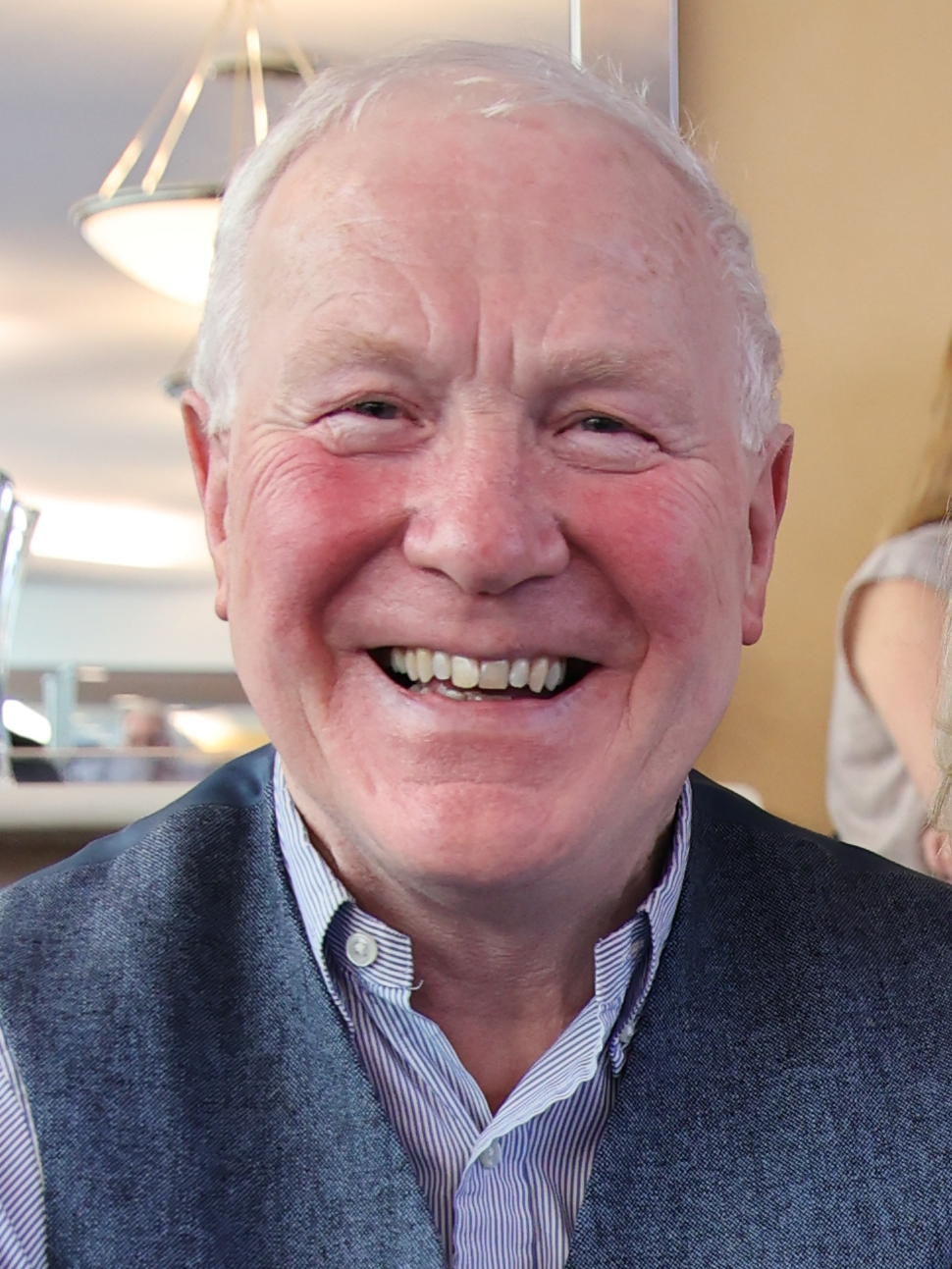
- Conway in 2025

Senator
- Incumbent
- Assumed office January 2025
- Constituency: Cultural and Educational Panel

Waterford City and County Councillor
- In office May 2014 – January 2025
- Constituency: Tramore–Waterford City West

Waterford County Councillor
- In office June 2009 – May 2014
- Constituency: Tramore

Personal details
- Born: County Longford, Ireland
- Party: Independent

Joe Conway is an independent Irish politician who has been a senator for the Cultural and Educational Panel since January 2025.

Conway was a member of Tramore Town Council from 2004 to 2009. He was a member of Waterford County Council from 2009 to 2014, and a member of Waterford City and County Council for the Tramore–Waterford City West area from May 2014 to January 2025. Conway was Mayor of Waterford from 2023 to 2024.

He unsuccessfully contested the 2011 general election for the Waterford constituency. He unsuccessfully contested the 2020 Seanad election.

Before entering politics he was a national school principal and was a member of Údarás na Gaeltachta, who nominated him for the Seanad election.

== Comments on special needs education in schools ==
=== Comments ===
In March 2026 Conway spoke to an Oireachtas committee on education where he said that if schools built a sense of independence in "needy or attention-seeking" pupils that there would be less need for educational support such as Special Needs Assistants in schools. He also said that he believed the system was producing "a situation where there is an untoward gravitation towards supports and it may not always be necessary" and "Lots of children will present in a classroom as being needy or attention-seeking, and teachers are overworked". He also said "If you have needy or attention-seeking children it can be very very fractious, and so you try to build a sense of independence in students. The more you build confidence the less deferment there will be for supports." He also said there "must be something fundamentally wrong with schools" when there is "so much deferment" by pupils with special needs to Special Needs Assistants.

=== Reactions ===
His comments were criticised by autism advocates.

Autistic student advocate Emily McPhillips-Sheridan said "That’s not right. Children have needs, it's not that they are attention-seeking." She had said earlier that she knew from personal experience how education shapes the lives of autistic students. She also said "When vital educational supports are not available or are delayed the consequences can be significant. When the right supports are in place autistic students can thrive". She was speaking before the committee.

Adam Harris, CEO of AsIAm, said there was "an expectation that we should conform to an environment that treats us as 'misbehaving children’ as opposed to meeting our needs and centring our rights". Harris also described Conways comments as "deeply disappointing", that they were "throwaway remarks" that could "feed into a growing tide of misinformation on autism and disability". Harris also said "True inclusion requires adaptation and investment," and "It is neither attention seeking nor needy to expect both." and that the comments were "deeply insulting and out of step with what is the lived experience of autistic children and families".
