= Waterford City Council =

Former local government authority for Waterford city in Ireland (1898–2014)

Waterford City Council Comhairle Cathrach Phort Láirge

Type
- Type: City council

History
- Established: 1898
- Disbanded: 1 June 2014
- Preceded by: Grand Jury
- Succeeded by: Waterford City and County Council
- Seats: 17

Elections
- Last election: 5 June 2009

Meeting place
- City Hall, Waterford

The area governed by the council

Waterford City Council (Irish: Comhairle Cathrach Phort Láirge) was the authority responsible for local government in the city of Waterford in Ireland until 2014.

As a city council, it was governed by the Local Government Act 2001. The council was responsible for housing and community, roads and transportation, urban planning and development, amenity and culture, and environment.

The council had 15 elected members. Elections for the council were held every five years and Councillors were elected by single transferable vote. The head of the council had the title of Mayor. The city administration was headed by a City Manager. The council met at City Hall, Waterford.

In late 2012, the Minister for the Environment, Community and Local Government Phil Hogan announced the proposed merger of Waterford County Council and Waterford City Council. It was abolished in June 2014 when the Local Government Reform Act 2014 was implemented. It was succeeded by Waterford City and County Council.

For the purpose of local elections the city was divided into three local electoral areas: Waterford City East (6), Waterford City North (4) and Waterford City South (5).
