= 18th Dáil =

TDs from 1965 to 1969

←	17th Dáil	19th Dáil	→

Overview
- Legislative body: Dáil Éireann
- Jurisdiction: Ireland
- Meeting place: Leinster House
- Term: 21 April 1965 – 22 May 1969
- Election: 1965 general election
- Government: 11th government of Ireland (1965–1966); 12th government of Ireland (1966–1969)
- Members: 144
- Ceann Comhairle: Cormac Breslin — Patrick Hogan until 14 November 1967
- Taoiseach: Jack Lynch — Seán Lemass until 10 November 1966
- Tánaiste: Frank Aiken
- Chief Whip: Michael Carty
- Leader of the Opposition: Liam Cosgrave

Sessions
- 1st: 21 April 1965 – 21 July 1965
- 2nd: 20 October 1965 – 8 July 1966
- 3rd: 27 September 1966 – 26 July 1967
- 4th: 18 October 1967 – 11 July 1968
- 5th: 23 October 1968 – 21 May 1969

The 18th Dáil was elected at the 1965 general election on 7 April 1965 and met on 21 April 1965. The members of Dáil Éireann, the house of representatives of the Oireachtas (legislature) of Ireland, are known as TDs. It sat with the 11th Seanad as the two Houses of the Oireachtas.

The 18th Dáil saw a change of Taoiseach from Seán Lemass to Jack Lynch in November 1966. On 22 May 1969, President Éamon de Valera dissolved the Dáil at the request of Taoiseach Jack Lynch. The 18th Dáil lasted 4 years, 31 days.

== Composition of the 18th Dáil ==
- 11th, 12th government

Party	Apr. 1965	May 1969	Change
Fianna Fáil	72	73	▲1
Fine Gael	47	46	▼1
Labour	22	18	▼4
Clann na Poblachta (Note: Clann na Poblachta was dissolved in July 1965, with their only elected TD John Tully sitting as an independent for the rest of the Dáil.)	1	—N/a	▼1
Independent	2	3	▲1
Ceann Comhairle	—N/a	1	▲1
Vacant	—N/a	3	▲3
Total	144		

Fianna Fáil formed the 11th government of Ireland led by Seán Lemass as Taoiseach. In 1966, Lemass resigned as Fianna Fáil leader and Taoiseach, to be succeeded by Jack Lynch, who formed the 12th government of Ireland.

=== Graphical representation ===
This is a graphical comparison of party strengths in the 18th Dáil from April 1965. This was not the official seating plan.

== Ceann Comhairle ==
On the meeting of the Dáil, Patrick Hogan (Lab), who had served as Ceann Comhairle since 1951, was proposed by Seán Lemass (FF) and seconded by James Dillon (FG) for the position. His election was approved without a vote.

On 7 November 1967, Hogan retired as Ceann Comhairle. Cormac Breslin (FF), the Leas-Cheann Comhairle, was appointed to the position on a temporary basis. On 14 November, Breslin was proposed by Lemass to the position on a permanent basis. His election was approved without a vote.

== TDs by constituency ==
The list of the 144 TDs elected is given in alphabetical order by Dáil constituency.

Members of the 18th Dáil
Constituency	Name	Party
Carlow–Kilkenny	Patrick Crotty	Fine Gael
Carlow–Kilkenny	Jim Gibbons	Fianna Fáil
Carlow–Kilkenny	Desmond Governey	Fine Gael
Carlow–Kilkenny	Tom Nolan	Fianna Fáil
Carlow–Kilkenny	Séamus Pattison	Labour
Cavan	Tom Fitzpatrick	Fine Gael
Cavan	Paddy Smith	Fianna Fáil
Cavan	John Tully	Clann na Poblachta
Clare	Patrick Hillery	Fianna Fáil
Clare	William Murphy	Fine Gael
Clare	Patrick Hogan	Labour
Clare	Seán Ó Ceallaigh	Fianna Fáil
Cork Borough	Stephen Barrett	Fine Gael
Cork Borough	Seán Casey	Labour
Cork Borough	Gus Healy	Fianna Fáil
Cork Borough	Jack Lynch	Fianna Fáil
Cork Borough	Pearse Wyse	Fianna Fáil
Cork Mid	Donal Creed	Fine Gael
Cork Mid	Flor Crowley	Fianna Fáil
Cork Mid	Eileen Desmond	Labour
Cork Mid	Thomas Meaney	Fianna Fáil
Cork North-East	Richard Barry	Fine Gael
Cork North-East	Philip Burton	Fine Gael
Cork North-East	Martin Corry	Fianna Fáil
Cork North-East	Jerry Cronin	Fianna Fáil
Cork North-East	Patrick McAuliffe	Labour
Cork South-West	Seán Collins	Fine Gael
Cork South-West	Edward Cotter	Fianna Fáil
Cork South-West	Michael Pat Murphy	Labour
Donegal North-East	Neil Blaney	Fianna Fáil
Donegal North-East	Liam Cunningham	Fianna Fáil
Donegal North-East	Paddy Harte	Fine Gael
Donegal South-West	Joseph Brennan	Fianna Fáil
Donegal South-West	Cormac Breslin	Fianna Fáil
Donegal South-West	Patrick O'Donnell	Fine Gael
Dublin County	Kevin Boland	Fianna Fáil
Dublin County	Patrick Burke	Fianna Fáil
Dublin County	Mark Clinton	Fine Gael
Dublin County	Seán Dunne	Labour
Dublin County	Des Foley	Fianna Fáil
Dublin North-Central	Luke Belton	Fine Gael
Dublin North-Central	Vivion de Valera	Fianna Fáil
Dublin North-Central	Celia Lynch	Fianna Fáil
Dublin North-Central	Michael O'Leary	Labour
Dublin North-East	Paddy Belton	Fine Gael
Dublin North-East	Patrick Byrne	Fine Gael
Dublin North-East	George Colley	Fianna Fáil
Dublin North-East	Charles Haughey	Fianna Fáil
Dublin North-East	Denis Larkin	Labour
Dublin North-West	Declan Costello	Fine Gael
Dublin North-West	Richard Gogan	Fianna Fáil
Dublin North-West	Michael Mullen	Labour
Dublin South-Central	Philip Brady	Fianna Fáil
Dublin South-Central	Frank Cluskey	Labour
Dublin South-Central	Maurice E. Dockrell	Fine Gael
Dublin South-Central	Tom Fitzpatrick	Fianna Fáil
Dublin South-Central	Seán Lemass	Fianna Fáil
Dublin South-East	John A. Costello	Fine Gael
Dublin South-East	Seán MacEntee	Fianna Fáil
Dublin South-East	Seán Moore	Fianna Fáil
Dublin South-West	Ben Briscoe	Fianna Fáil
Dublin South-West	Joseph Dowling	Fianna Fáil
Dublin South-West	Noel Lemass	Fianna Fáil
Dublin South-West	John O'Connell	Labour
Dublin South-West	Richie Ryan	Fine Gael
Dún Laoghaire and Rathdown	David Andrews	Fianna Fáil
Dún Laoghaire and Rathdown	Lionel Booth	Fianna Fáil
Dún Laoghaire and Rathdown	Liam Cosgrave	Fine Gael
Dún Laoghaire and Rathdown	H. Percy Dockrell	Fine Gael
Galway East	Michael Carty	Fianna Fáil
Galway East	John Donnellan	Fine Gael
Galway East	Brigid Hogan-O'Higgins	Fine Gael
Galway East	Michael F. Kitt	Fianna Fáil
Galway East	Anthony Millar	Fianna Fáil
Galway West	Fintan Coogan	Fine Gael
Galway West	Johnny Geoghegan	Fianna Fáil
Galway West	Bobby Molloy	Fianna Fáil
Kerry North	Patrick Finucane	Independent
Kerry North	Tom McEllistrim	Fianna Fáil
Kerry North	Dan Spring	Labour
Kerry South	Honor Crowley	Fianna Fáil
Kerry South	Patrick Connor	Fine Gael
Kerry South	Timothy O'Connor	Fianna Fáil
Kildare	Terence Boylan	Fianna Fáil
Kildare	Brendan Crinion	Fianna Fáil
Kildare	Patrick Norton	Labour
Kildare	Gerard Sweetman	Fine Gael
Laois–Offaly	Henry Byrne	Labour
Laois–Offaly	Nicholas Egan	Fianna Fáil
Laois–Offaly	Oliver J. Flanagan	Fine Gael
Laois–Offaly	Patrick Lalor	Fianna Fáil
Laois–Offaly	Tom O'Higgins	Fine Gael
Limerick East	Paddy Clohessy	Fianna Fáil
Limerick East	Stephen Coughlan	Labour
Limerick East	Tom O'Donnell	Fine Gael
Limerick East	Donogh O'Malley	Fianna Fáil
Limerick West	James Collins	Fianna Fáil
Limerick West	Denis Jones	Fine Gael
Limerick West	Donnchadh Ó Briain	Fianna Fáil
Longford–Westmeath	Frank Carter	Fianna Fáil
Longford–Westmeath	Patrick Lenihan	Fianna Fáil
Longford–Westmeath	Gerry L'Estrange	Fine Gael
Longford–Westmeath	Joe Sheridan	Independent
Louth	Frank Aiken	Fianna Fáil
Louth	Paddy Donegan	Fine Gael
Louth	Pádraig Faulkner	Fianna Fáil
Mayo North	Phelim Calleary	Fianna Fáil
Mayo North	Patrick Lindsay	Fine Gael
Mayo North	Thomas O'Hara	Fine Gael
Mayo South	Seán Flanagan	Fianna Fáil
Mayo South	Henry Kenny	Fine Gael
Mayo South	Michael Lyons	Fine Gael
Mayo South	Mícheál Ó Móráin	Fianna Fáil
Meath	Denis Farrelly	Fine Gael
Meath	Michael Hilliard	Fianna Fáil
Meath	James Tully	Labour
Monaghan	Erskine H. Childers	Fianna Fáil
Monaghan	James Dillon	Fine Gael
Monaghan	Patrick Mooney	Fianna Fáil
Roscommon	Joan Burke	Fine Gael
Roscommon	Hugh Gibbons	Fianna Fáil
Roscommon	Brian Lenihan	Fianna Fáil
Roscommon	Patrick J. Reynolds	Fine Gael
Sligo–Leitrim	James Gallagher	Fianna Fáil
Sligo–Leitrim	Eugene Gilbride	Fianna Fáil
Sligo–Leitrim	Eugene Gilhawley	Fine Gael
Sligo–Leitrim	Joseph McLoughlin	Fine Gael
Tipperary North	Thomas Dunne	Fine Gael
Tipperary North	John Fanning	Fianna Fáil
Tipperary North	Patrick Tierney	Labour
Tipperary South	Don Davern	Fianna Fáil
Tipperary South	Jackie Fahey	Fianna Fáil
Tipperary South	Patrick Hogan	Fine Gael
Tipperary South	Seán Treacy	Labour
Waterford	Billy Kenneally	Fianna Fáil
Waterford	Thomas Kyne	Labour
Waterford	Thaddeus Lynch	Fine Gael
Wexford	Lorcan Allen	Fianna Fáil
Wexford	Brendan Corish	Labour
Wexford	Anthony Esmonde	Fine Gael
Wexford	James Kennedy	Fianna Fáil
Wicklow	Paudge Brennan	Fianna Fáil
Wicklow	James Everett	Labour
Wicklow	Michael O'Higgins	Fine Gael

== Changes ==
Date	Constituency	Loss	Gain	Note
21 April 1965	Clare	Labour	Ceann Comhairle	Patrick Hogan takes office as Ceann Comhairle
10 July 1965	Cavan	Clann na Poblachta	Independent	John Tully becomes an independent TD on the dissolution of Clann na Poblachta
18 October 1966	Kerry South	Fianna Fáil		Death of Honor Crowley
25 October 1966	Waterford	Fine Gael		Death of Thaddeus Lynch
7 December 1966	Kerry South		Fianna Fáil	John O'Leary holds seat vacated by the death of Crowley
7 December 1966	Waterford		Fianna Fáil	Fad Browne wins seat vacated by the death of Lynch
29 April 1967	Cork Borough	Labour		Death of Seán Casey
1 September 1967	Limerick West	Fianna Fáil		Death of James Collins
7 November 1967	Clare	Ceann Comhairle	Labour	Patrick Hogan retires as Ceann Comhairle
9 November 1967	Cork Borough		Fianna Fáil	Seán French wins seat vacated by the death of Casey
9 November 1967	Limerick West		Fianna Fáil	Gerry Collins holds seat vacated by the death of his father James Collins
14 November 1967	Donegal South-West	Fianna Fáil	Ceann Comhairle	Cormac Breslin takes office as Ceann Comhairle
16 November 1967	Clare	Fine Gael		Death of William Murphy
14 December 1967	Kildare	Labour	Independent	Patrick Norton resigns from the Labour Party
18 December 1967	Wicklow	Labour		Death of James Everett
10 March 1968	Limerick East	Fianna Fáil		Death of Donogh O'Malley
14 March 1968	Clare		Fianna Fáil	Sylvester Barrett wins seat vacated by the death of Murphy
14 March 1968	Wicklow		Fine Gael	Godfrey Timmins wins seat vacated by the death of Everett
22 May 1968	Limerick East		Fianna Fáil	Desmond O'Malley holds seat vacated by the death of his uncle Donogh O'Malley
13 September 1968	Wexford	Fianna Fáil		Death of James Kennedy
2 November 1968	Tipperary South	Fianna Fáil		Death of Don Davern
26 February 1969	Kildare	Independent	Fianna Fáil	Patrick Norton joins Fianna Fáil
24 January 1969	Clare	Labour		Death of Patrick Hogan
