= Frank Taylor (Irish politician) =

Irish politician (1914–1998)

Teachta Dála
- In office June 1969 – June 1981
- Constituency: Clare

Personal details
- Born: 30 May 1914 County Clare, Ireland
- Died: 15 April 1998 (aged 83) County Clare, Ireland
- Party: Fine Gael
- Children: Madeleine Taylor-Quinn

Francis Taylor (30 May 1914 – 15 April 1998) was an Irish Fine Gael politician.

A farmer before entering politics, he was first elected to the Dáil Éireann as a Fine Gael Teachta Dála (TD) for the Clare constituency at the 1969 general election, recapturing the seat held by Fine Gael TD William Murphy, who had died in 1967 and been replaced at the Clare by-election by Fianna Fáil's Sylvester Barrett.

Taylor was re-elected at the 1973 and 1977 general elections. When he retired from Dáil Éireann at the 1981 general election, his daughter Madeleine Taylor-Quinn was elected.

== See also ==
- Families in the Oireachtas

| Dáil | Election | Deputy (Party) | Deputy (Party) | Deputy (Party) | Deputy (Party) | Deputy (Party) |
|---|---|---|---|---|---|---|
| 2nd | 1921 | Éamon de Valera (SF) | Brian O'Higgins (SF) | Seán Liddy (SF) | Patrick Brennan (SF) | 4 seats 1921–1923 |
| 3rd | 1922 | Éamon de Valera (AT-SF) | Brian O'Higgins (AT-SF) | Seán Liddy (PT-SF) | Patrick Brennan (PT-SF) | 4 seats 1921–1923 |
| 4th | 1923 | Éamon de Valera (Rep) | Brian O'Higgins (Rep) | Conor Hogan (FP) | Patrick Hogan (Lab) | Eoin MacNeill (CnaG) |
| 5th | 1927 (Jun) | Éamon de Valera (FF) | Patrick Houlihan (FF) | Thomas Falvey (FP) | Patrick Hogan (Lab) | Patrick Kelly (CnaG) |
| 6th | 1927 (Sep) | Éamon de Valera (FF) | Patrick Houlihan (FF) | Martin Sexton (FF) | Patrick Hogan (Lab) | Patrick Kelly (CnaG) |
| 7th | 1932 | Éamon de Valera (FF) | Seán O'Grady (FF) | Martin Sexton (FF) | Patrick Hogan (Lab) | Patrick Burke (CnaG) |
| 8th | 1933 | Éamon de Valera (FF) | Seán O'Grady (FF) | Patrick Houlihan (FF) | Patrick Hogan (Lab) | Patrick Burke (CnaG) |
| 9th | 1937 | Éamon de Valera (FF) | Seán O'Grady (FF) | Thomas Burke (FP) | Patrick Hogan (Lab) | Patrick Burke (FG) |
| 10th | 1938 | Éamon de Valera (FF) | Seán O'Grady (FF) | Thomas Burke (FP) | Peter O'Loghlen (FF) | Patrick Burke (FG) |
| 11th | 1943 | Éamon de Valera (FF) | Seán O'Grady (FF) | Thomas Burke (FP) | Patrick Hogan (Lab) | Patrick Burke (FG) |
| 12th | 1944 | Éamon de Valera (FF) | Seán O'Grady (FF) | Thomas Burke (FP) | Peter O'Loghlen (FF) | Patrick Burke (FG) |
| 12th | 1945 by-election | Éamon de Valera (FF) | Seán O'Grady (FF) | Thomas Burke (FP) | Peter O'Loghlen (FF) | Patrick Shanahan (FF) |
| 13th | 1948 | Éamon de Valera (FF) | Seán O'Grady (FF) | Thomas Burke (FP) | Patrick Hogan (Lab) | 4 seats 1948–1969 |
| 14th | 1951 | Éamon de Valera (FF) | Patrick Hillery (FF) | William Murphy (FG) | Patrick Hogan (Lab) | 4 seats 1948–1969 |
| 15th | 1954 | Éamon de Valera (FF) | Patrick Hillery (FF) | William Murphy (FG) | Patrick Hogan (Lab) | 4 seats 1948–1969 |
| 16th | 1957 | Éamon de Valera (FF) | Patrick Hillery (FF) | William Murphy (FG) | Patrick Hogan (Lab) | 4 seats 1948–1969 |
| 16th | 1959 by-election | Seán Ó Ceallaigh (FF) | Patrick Hillery (FF) | William Murphy (FG) | Patrick Hogan (Lab) | 4 seats 1948–1969 |
| 17th | 1961 | Seán Ó Ceallaigh (FF) | Patrick Hillery (FF) | William Murphy (FG) | Patrick Hogan (Lab) | 4 seats 1948–1969 |
| 18th | 1965 | Seán Ó Ceallaigh (FF) | Patrick Hillery (FF) | William Murphy (FG) | Patrick Hogan (Lab) | 4 seats 1948–1969 |
| 18th | 1968 by-election | Seán Ó Ceallaigh (FF) | Patrick Hillery (FF) | Sylvester Barrett (FF) | Patrick Hogan (Lab) | 4 seats 1948–1969 |
| 19th | 1969 | Frank Taylor (FG) | Patrick Hillery (FF) | Sylvester Barrett (FF) | 3 seats 1969–1981 | |
| 20th | 1973 | Frank Taylor (FG) | Brendan Daly (FF) | Sylvester Barrett (FF) | 3 seats 1969–1981 | |
| 21st | 1977 | Frank Taylor (FG) | Brendan Daly (FF) | Sylvester Barrett (FF) | 3 seats 1969–1981 | |
| 22nd | 1981 | Madeleine Taylor (FG) | Brendan Daly (FF) | Sylvester Barrett (FF) | Bill Loughnane (FF) | 4 seats since 1981 |
| 23rd | 1982 (Feb) | Donal Carey (FG) | Brendan Daly (FF) | Sylvester Barrett (FF) | Bill Loughnane (FF) | 4 seats since 1981 |
| 24th | 1982 (Nov) | Donal Carey (FG) | Brendan Daly (FF) | Sylvester Barrett (FF) | Madeleine Taylor-Quinn (FG) | 4 seats since 1981 |
| 25th | 1987 | Donal Carey (FG) | Brendan Daly (FF) | Síle de Valera (FF) | Madeleine Taylor-Quinn (FG) | 4 seats since 1981 |
| 26th | 1989 | Donal Carey (FG) | Brendan Daly (FF) | Síle de Valera (FF) | Madeleine Taylor-Quinn (FG) | 4 seats since 1981 |
| 27th | 1992 | Donal Carey (FG) | Moosajee Bhamjee (Lab) | Síle de Valera (FF) | Tony Killeen (FF) | 4 seats since 1981 |
| 28th | 1997 | Donal Carey (FG) | Brendan Daly (FF) | Síle de Valera (FF) | Tony Killeen (FF) | 4 seats since 1981 |
| 29th | 2002 | Pat Breen (FG) | James Breen (Ind.) | Síle de Valera (FF) | Tony Killeen (FF) | 4 seats since 1981 |
| 30th | 2007 | Pat Breen (FG) | Joe Carey (FG) | Timmy Dooley (FF) | Tony Killeen (FF) | 4 seats since 1981 |
| 31st | 2011 | Pat Breen (FG) | Joe Carey (FG) | Timmy Dooley (FF) | Michael McNamara (Lab) | 4 seats since 1981 |
| 32nd | 2016 | Pat Breen (FG) | Joe Carey (FG) | Timmy Dooley (FF) | Michael Harty (Ind.) | 4 seats since 1981 |
| 33rd | 2020 | Violet-Anne Wynne (SF) | Joe Carey (FG) | Cathal Crowe (FF) | Michael McNamara (Ind.) | 4 seats since 1981 |
| 34th | 2024 | Donna McGettigan (SF) | Joe Cooney (FG) | Cathal Crowe (FF) | Timmy Dooley (FF) | 4 seats since 1981 |
