= 1967 Limerick West by-election =

By-election to the 18th Dáil

- 9 November 1967
- Turnout: 26,669 (80.9%)
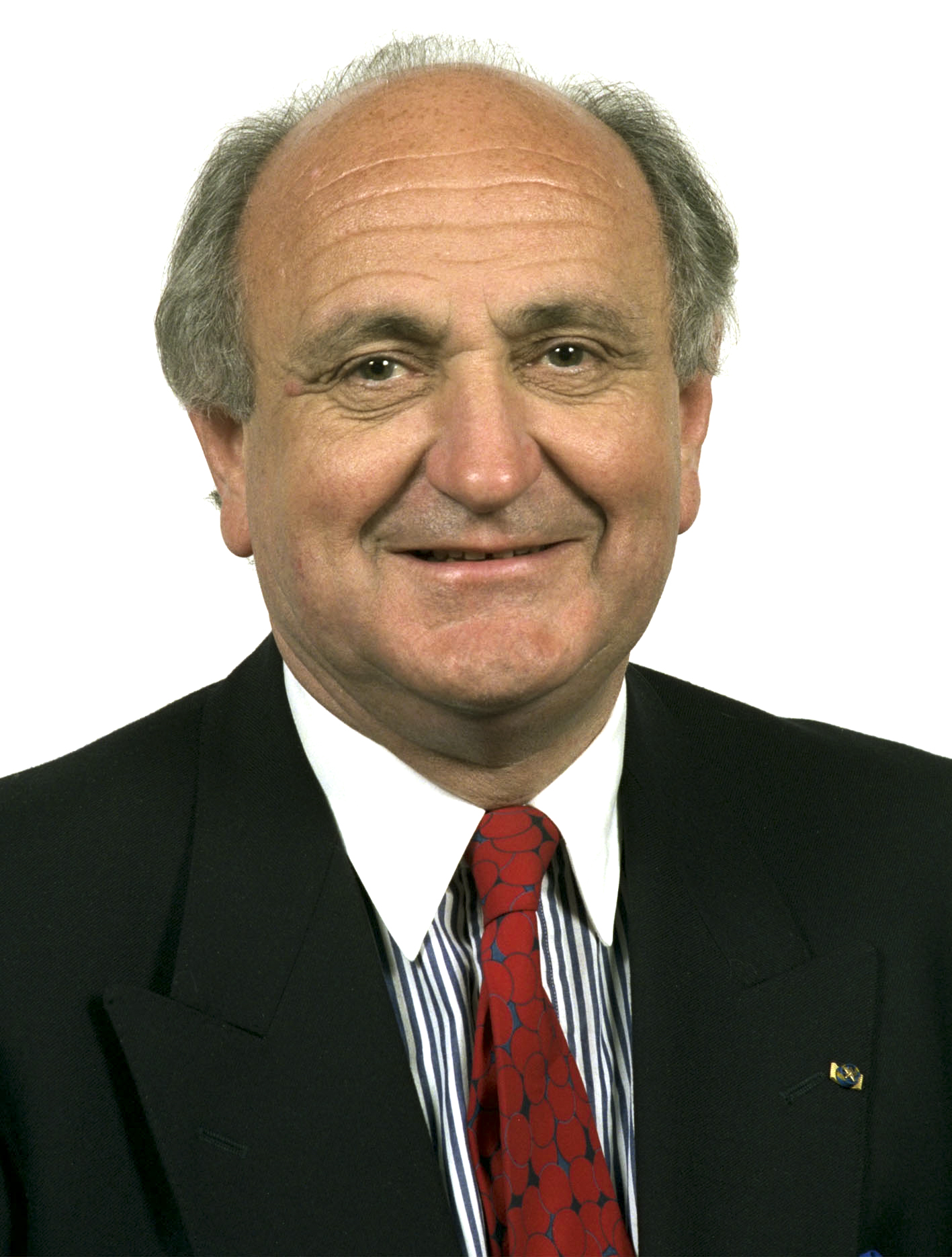
		Madden	Dwyer
Nominee	Gerry Collins	William Madden	Edward Dwyer
Party	Fianna Fáil	Fine Gael	Labour
First preferences	14,384	10,237	2,048
Percentage	53.8%	38.6%	7.7%
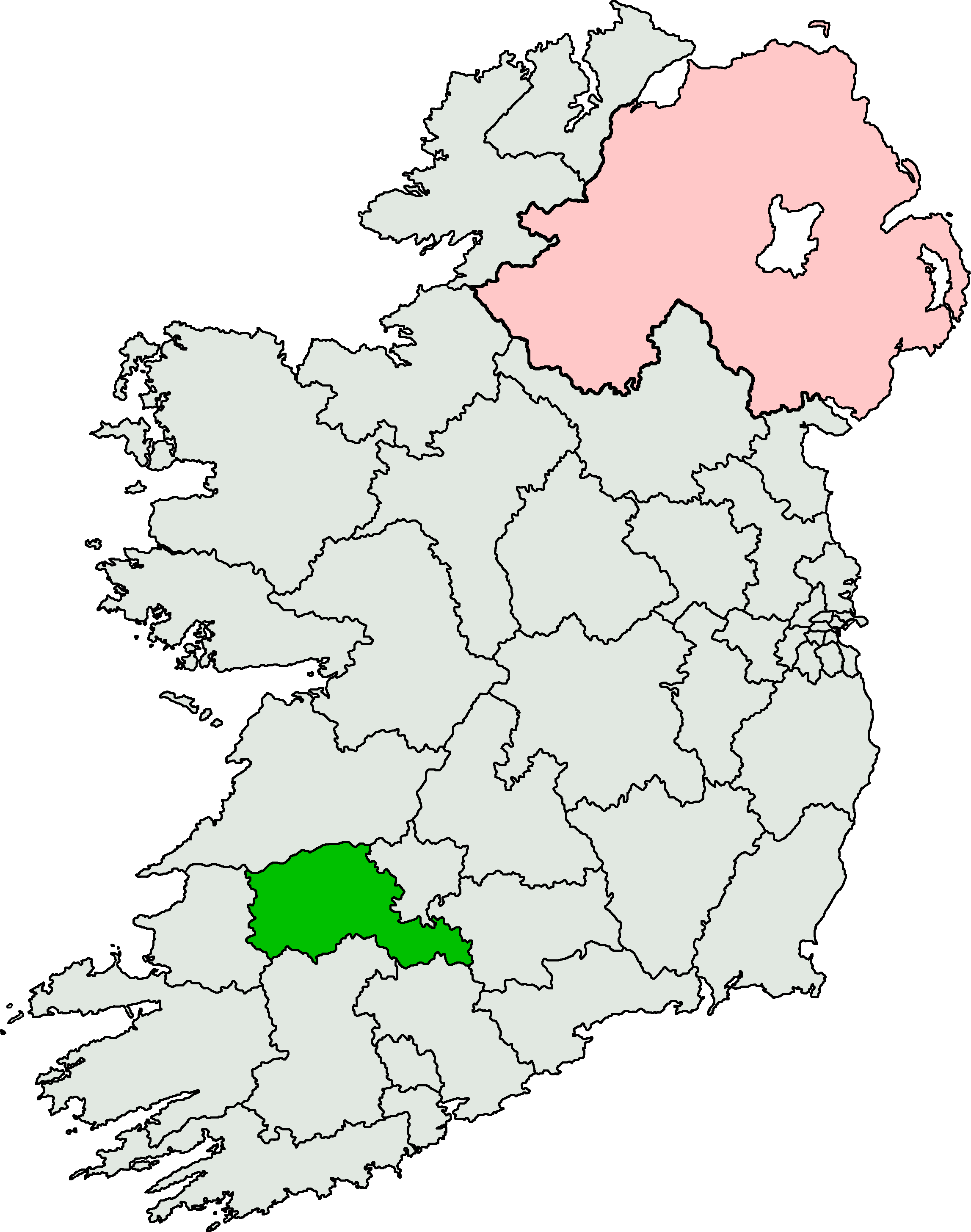
- Limerick West shown within Ireland
TD before election
James Collins
Fianna Fáil
TD after election
Gerry Collins
Fianna Fáil

A Dáil by-election was held in the constituency of Limerick West in Ireland on Thursday, 9 November 1967, to fill a vacancy in the 18th Dáil. It followed the death of Fianna Fáil Teachta Dála (TD) James Collins on 1 September 1967.

The writ of election to fill the vacancy was agreed by the Dáil on 18 October 1967.

The by-election was won by the Fianna Fáil candidate Gerry Collins, son of the deceased TD, James Collins. It was held on the same day as the 1967 Cork Borough by-election. Both by-elections were won by Fianna Fáil candidates.

== Result ==
1967 Limerick West by-election
Party	Candidate	FPv%	Count
Party	Candidate	FPv%	1
Fianna Fáil	Gerry Collins	53.8	14,384
Fine Gael	William Madden	38.6	10,237
Labour	Edward Dwyer	7.7	2,048
Electorate: 32,958 Valid: 26,669 Quota: 13,335 Turnout: 80.9%
