= Niall Collins =

Irish politician (born 1973)

Niall Collins TD
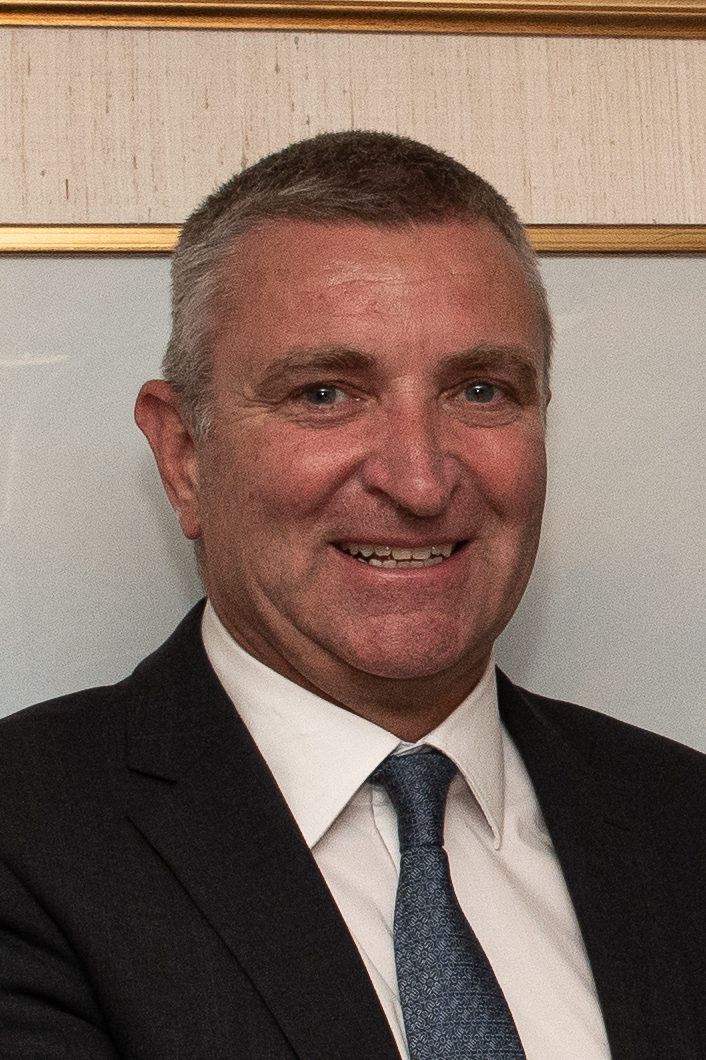
- Collins in 2026

Minister of State
- 2026–: Agriculture, Food and the Marine
- 2025–2026: Justice, Home Affairs and Migration
- 2020–2025: Further and Higher Education, Research, Innovation and Science

Teachta Dála
- Incumbent
- Assumed office February 2016
- Constituency: Limerick County
- In office February 2011 – February 2016
- Constituency: Limerick
- In office May 2007 – February 2011
- Constituency: Limerick West

Personal details
- Born: 30 March 1973 (age 53) Limerick, Ireland
- Party: Fianna Fáil
- Spouse: Eimear O'Connor (m. 2000)
- Children: 2
- Relatives: James Collins (grandfather); Michael J. Collins (uncle); Gerry Collins (uncle)
- Education: Limerick Institute of Technology
- Website: niallcollinstd.ie

Niall Collins (born 30 March 1973) is an Irish Fianna Fáil politician who has served as a Minister for State in three positions since 2020, most recently in the Department of Agriculture, Food and the Marine since 2026. He has been a Teachta Dála (TD) for the Limerick County constituency since 2016, and from 2011 to 2016 for the Limerick constituency and from 2007 to 2011 for the Limerick West constituency.

== Career ==
Collins was elected for the Local electoral area of Bruff at the 2004 Limerick County Council election. Collins was elected to the Dáil Éireann at the 2007 general election for Limerick West. He was elected on the first count, and the highest vote of any of the newcomers to the 30th Dáil. His grandfather James Collins represented Limerick West in the Dáil from 1948 until 1967. His uncle Gerry Collins is a former Minister and MEP, who was a TD for Limerick West from 1967 to 1997. Another uncle, Michael J. Collins, sat for Limerick West in the Dáil from 1997 until he retired in 2007.

He has served in various Fianna Fáil Front Bench roles, he has served as Opposition spokesperson for Justice and Equality from 2011 to 2016, Opposition Spokesperson for Jobs, Enterprise and Innovation from May 2016 to March 2018 and Opposition Spokesperson for Foreign Affairs and Trade from March 2018 to June 2020.

Collins was appointed Minister of State at the Department of Further and Higher Education, Research, Innovation and Science with responsibility for skills and further education in July 2020. He was re-elected at the 2024 general election. On 29 January 2025, he was appointed as Minister of State at the Department of Justice, Home Affairs and Migration with special responsibility for international law, law reform and youth justice. He was appointed as Minister of State at the Department of Agriculture, Food and the Marine with responsibility for forestry, farm safety and horticulture on 28 May 2026, succeeding Michael Healy-Rae who had resigned the previous month.

== Controversies ==
In February 2023, political news website The Ditch published a story claiming that Collins had misled Limerick County Council about his place of residence in a 2001 planning application. While not addressing the question of stated residence, Collins said he was "entirely satisfied" that his planning application was valid, and that he met the correct planning criteria applicable at the time. He told the Dáil that the article in The Ditch was "misleading and inaccurate". The Tánaiste Micheál Martin defended Collins, saying that he was entitled to seek planning permission.

In April 2023, a further investigation by The Ditch found publicly available information that showed that Collins's wife, Eimear O'Connor, a GP, requested to buy land from Limerick County Council in 2006. Following a motion by fellow Fianna Fáil councillor Leonard Enright, Niall Collins voted at a local area committee meeting in favour of selling the land. The sale to O'Connor was formally approved in 2008 at a meeting of Limerick County Council, for which the minutes included "The disposal of this site was agreed by the members of the Bruff Electoral Area at the meeting held in January 2007", in which Collins had participated; Collins had been elected TD in May 2007 while the sales process was proceeding. Under the Local Government Act, 2001, a county or city councillor is prohibited from voting when "where he or she has actual knowledge that he or she or a connected person has a pecuniary or other beneficial interest in, or which is material to, the matter". In December 2007, Eimar O'Connor sought planning permission to build a medical centre and offices on the land, which she had yet to purchase. This permission was given despite objections from local residents, who said in a letter "local school children in the nearby primary school regularly use this green space". O'Connor became owner of the land in January 2009. Trees and hedging were cut down, and the site left vacant for the following decade. In April 2020, an email was sent to the County Council looking to discuss selling social housing to the Council. Further to this, a planning consultant had claimed that Collins was the owner of the land, a claim Collins denied.

== See also ==
- Families in the Oireachtas

Political offices
Preceded by Noel Grealish; Timmy Dooley; Michael Healy-Rae	Minister of State at the Department of Agriculture, Food and the Marine; 2025–2026; With: Noel Grealish; Timmy Dooley	Incumbent
Preceded by James Browne	Minister of State at the Department of Justice, Home Affairs and Migration; 2025–present With: Colm Brophy	Succeeded by Catherine Ardagh; Colm Brophy
Preceded by Mary Mitchell O'Connor as Minister of State at the Department of Education and Skills	Minister of State at the Department of Further and Higher Education, Research, Innovation and Science; 2020–2025	Succeeded by Marian Harkin

Dáil	Election	Deputy (Party)	Deputy (Party)	Deputy (Party)
13th	1948	James Collins (FF)	Donnchadh Ó Briain (FF)	David Madden (FG)
14th	1951	James Collins (FF)	Donnchadh Ó Briain (FF)	David Madden (FG)
15th	1954	James Collins (FF)	Donnchadh Ó Briain (FF)	David Madden (FG)
15th	1955 by-election	James Collins (FF)	Donnchadh Ó Briain (FF)	Michael Colbert (FF)
16th	1957	James Collins (FF)	Donnchadh Ó Briain (FF)	Denis Jones (FG)
17th	1961	James Collins (FF)	Donnchadh Ó Briain (FF)	Denis Jones (FG)
18th	1965	James Collins (FF)	Donnchadh Ó Briain (FF)	Denis Jones (FG)
18th	1967 by-election	Gerry Collins (FF)	Donnchadh Ó Briain (FF)	Denis Jones (FG)
19th	1969	Gerry Collins (FF)	Michael J. Noonan (FF)	Denis Jones (FG)
20th	1973	Gerry Collins (FF)	Michael J. Noonan (FF)	Denis Jones (FG)
21st	1977	Gerry Collins (FF)	Michael J. Noonan (FF)	William O'Brien (FG)
22nd	1981	Gerry Collins (FF)	Michael J. Noonan (FF)	William O'Brien (FG)
23rd	1982 (Feb)	Gerry Collins (FF)	Michael J. Noonan (FF)	William O'Brien (FG)
24th	1982 (Nov)	Gerry Collins (FF)	Michael J. Noonan (FF)	William O'Brien (FG)
25th	1987	Gerry Collins (FF)	Michael J. Noonan (FF)	John McCoy (PDs)
26th	1989	Gerry Collins (FF)	Michael J. Noonan (FF)	Michael Finucane (FG)
27th	1992	Gerry Collins (FF)	Michael J. Noonan (FF)	Michael Finucane (FG)
28th	1997	Michael Collins (FF)	Dan Neville (FG)	Michael Finucane (FG)
29th	2002	Michael Collins (FF)	Dan Neville (FG)	John Cregan (FF)
30th	2007	Niall Collins (FF)	Dan Neville (FG)	John Cregan (FF)
31st	2011	Constituency abolished. See Limerick and Kerry North–West Limerick		

Dáil	Election	Deputy (Party)	Deputy (Party)	Deputy (Party)	Deputy (Party)	Deputy (Party)	Deputy (Party)	Deputy (Party)
4th	1923	Richard Hayes (CnaG)	James Ledden (CnaG)	Seán Carroll (Rep)	James Colbert (Rep)	John Nolan (CnaG)	Patrick Clancy (Lab)	Patrick Hogan (FP)
4th	1924 by-election	Richard O'Connell (CnaG)	James Ledden (CnaG)	Seán Carroll (Rep)	James Colbert (Rep)	John Nolan (CnaG)	Patrick Clancy (Lab)	Patrick Hogan (FP)
5th	1927 (Jun)	Richard O'Connell (CnaG)	Gilbert Hewson (Ind.)	Tadhg Crowley (FF)	James Colbert (FF)	George C. Bennett (CnaG)	Patrick Clancy (Lab)	Michael Keyes (Lab)
6th	1927 (Sep)	Richard O'Connell (CnaG)	Daniel Bourke (FF)	Tadhg Crowley (FF)	James Colbert (FF)	George C. Bennett (CnaG)	Patrick Clancy (Lab)	John Nolan (CnaG)
7th	1932	James Reidy (CnaG)	Daniel Bourke (FF)	Tadhg Crowley (FF)	James Colbert (FF)	George C. Bennett (CnaG)	Robert Ryan (FF)	John O'Shaughnessy (FP)
8th	1933	James Reidy (CnaG)	Daniel Bourke (FF)	Tadhg Crowley (FF)	Donnchadh Ó Briain (FF)	George C. Bennett (CnaG)	Robert Ryan (FF)	Michael Keyes (Lab)
9th	1937	John O'Shaughnessy (FG)	Daniel Bourke (FF)	Michael Colbert (FF)	Donnchadh Ó Briain (FF)	George C. Bennett (FG)	Robert Ryan (FF)	Michael Keyes (Lab)
10th	1938	James Reidy (FG)	Daniel Bourke (FF)	Tadhg Crowley (FF)	Donnchadh Ó Briain (FF)	George C. Bennett (FG)	Robert Ryan (FF)	Michael Keyes (Lab)
11th	1943	James Reidy (FG)	Daniel Bourke (FF)	Tadhg Crowley (FF)	Donnchadh Ó Briain (FF)	George C. Bennett (FG)	Robert Ryan (FF)	Michael Keyes (Lab)
12th	1944	James Reidy (FG)	Daniel Bourke (FF)	Michael Colbert (FF)	Donnchadh Ó Briain (FF)	George C. Bennett (FG)	Robert Ryan (FF)	Michael Keyes (Lab)
13th	1948	Constituency abolished. See Limerick East and Limerick West						

Dáil	Election	Deputy (Party)	Deputy (Party)	Deputy (Party)
31st	2011	Niall Collins (FF)	Dan Neville (FG)	Patrick O'Donovan (FG)
32nd	2016	Constituency abolished. See Limerick County		

Dáil	Election	Deputy (Party)	Deputy (Party)	Deputy (Party)
32nd	2016	Niall Collins (FF)	Patrick O'Donovan (FG)	Tom Neville (FG)
33rd	2020	Niall Collins (FF)	Patrick O'Donovan (FG)	Richard O'Donoghue (Ind.)
34th	2024	Niall Collins (FF)	Patrick O'Donovan (FG)	Richard O'Donoghue (II)
