= 1968 Wicklow by-election =

By-election to the 18th Dáil

- 14 March 1968
- Turnout: 26,293 (71.7%)
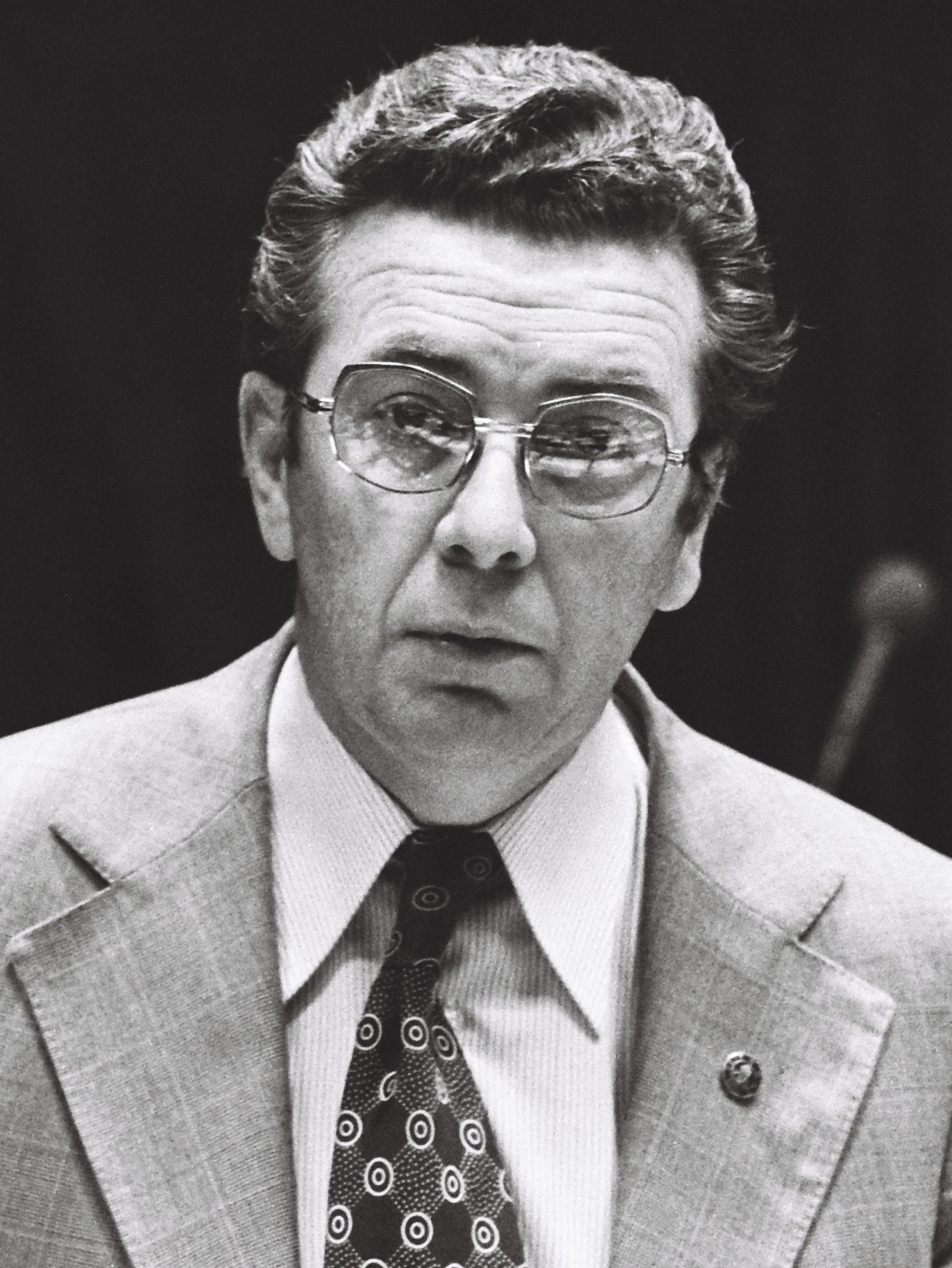
	Timmins	O'Neill
Nominee	Godfrey Timmins	Nancy O'Neill	Liam Kavanagh
Party	Fine Gael	Fianna Fáil	Labour
First preferences	8,035	9,788	5,761
Percentage	30.6%	37.2%	21.9%
Final count	12,596	12,050	–
TD before election
James Everett
Labour
TD after election
Godfrey Timmins
Fine Gael

A Dáil by-election was held in the constituency of Wicklow in Ireland on Thursday, 14 March 1968, to fill a vacancy in the 18th Dáil. It followed the death of Labour Teachta Dála (TD) James Everett on 18 December 1967.

The writ of election to fill the vacancy was agreed by the Dáil on 21 February 1968.

The by-election was won by the Fine Gael candidate Godfrey Timmins. It was held on the same day as the 1968 Clare by-election.

== Result ==
1968 Wicklow by-election
Party	Candidate	FPv%	Count				
Party	Candidate	FPv%	1	2	3	4	5
Fianna Fáil	Nancy O'Neill	37.2	9,788	9,829	9,945	10,343	12,050
Fine Gael	Godfrey Timmins	30.6	8,035	8,089	8,280	8,728	12,596
Labour	Liam Kavanagh	21.9	5,761	5,796	5,892	6,797	
Sinn Féin	Seamus Costello	7.6	2,009	2,024	2,081		
Liberal	Kevin McLeavey	1.9	509	526			
Independent	James J. Tallon	0.7	191				
Electorate: 36,658 Valid: 26,293 Quota: 13,147 Turnout: 71.7%
