= Michael Collins (Limerick politician) =

Irish politician (1940–2022)

Teachta Dála
- In office June 1997 – May 2007
- Constituency: Limerick West

Personal details
- Born: 1 November 1940 Abbeyfeale, County Limerick, Ireland
- Died: 3 December 2022 (aged 82) Limerick, Ireland
- Party: Independent
- Other political affiliations: Fianna Fáil (until 2002)
- Spouse: Una Collins
- Children: 3
- Parent: James Collins (father)
- Relatives: Gerry Collins (brother); Niall Collins (nephew)

Michael J. Collins (1 November 1940 – 3 December 2022) was an Irish politician who served as a Teachta Dála (TD) for Limerick West from 1997 to 2007. He was a member of Fianna Fáil until 2002, when he became an independent.

== Early life ==
Michael Collins was born in Abbeyfeale, County Limerick, in 1940. He was the son of James Collins and a brother of Gerry Collins, both Fianna Fáil members of Dáil Éireann.

== Career ==
Collins was involved in local politics for many years, serving as a member and chairman of the Limerick County Council. He was first elected to Dáil Éireann at the 1997 general election as a Fianna Fáil TD and held his seat until retiring at the 2007 general election citing health reasons.

== Tax evasion ==
Collins hit the headlines in 2003, when it was revealed that he had set up a bogus offshore account to evade paying tax. He settled the bill with the Revenue Commissioners, paying over €130,000 in taxes, interest and penalties. He also resigned from the Fianna Fáil parliamentary party after it emerged he was on the Revenue Commissioners's list of tax defaulters. He resigned the Fianna Fáil party whip in September 2003.

On 11 July 2006, Collins appeared in Rathkeale District Court charged with two tax offences: cheating the Collector General and obtaining a tax clearance certificate by false pretences. He was remanded on bail until 28 September 2006, when he was due to appear at Limerick District Court. On 9 January 2007, the court adjourned the case until after the general election of that year.

On 28 September 2007, after just under an hour of deliberation, a jury of seven men and five women returned its verdict. Collins was found guilty of obtaining a tax clearance certificate under false pretences.

=== Response of Standards Commission ===
Collins provided a Tax Clearance Certificate and a Statutory Declaration to the Standards Commission on 14 June 2002, as evidence of his compliance with the Tax Acts.

In September 2003, Collins's name appeared in Iris Oifigiúil, the state gazette, as the holder of a bogus non-resident bank account. The Standards Commission sought legal advice and were advised that in the absence of a complaint, it did not have the legal authority to investigate Collins. The Commission advised the Minister for Finance of the limitations of the Ethics Acts which had been exposed through this matter.

Subsequently, the Chairman of the Committee on Members' Interests of Dáil Éireann made a written complaint and the Committee determined that an investigation be carried out by the commission on foot of this. The investigation commenced but has been suspended pending the outcome of the Garda investigation and legal proceedings.

== Family legacy ==
His nephew, Niall Collins was elected to succeed him, maintaining the family's continuous occupation of a seat in that constituency since the 1948 general election. His son, James Collins, is a Fianna Fáil councillor on Limerick City and County Council representing Limerick City West and served as Mayor of Limerick from 2018 to 2019.

== Death ==
Collins died on 3 December 2022, at the age of 82.

== See also ==
- Families in the Oireachtas

| Dáil | Election | Deputy (Party) | Deputy (Party) | Deputy (Party) |
|---|---|---|---|---|
| 13th | 1948 | James Collins (FF) | Donnchadh Ó Briain (FF) | David Madden (FG) |
| 14th | 1951 | James Collins (FF) | Donnchadh Ó Briain (FF) | David Madden (FG) |
| 15th | 1954 | James Collins (FF) | Donnchadh Ó Briain (FF) | David Madden (FG) |
| 15th | 1955 by-election | James Collins (FF) | Donnchadh Ó Briain (FF) | Michael Colbert (FF) |
| 16th | 1957 | James Collins (FF) | Donnchadh Ó Briain (FF) | Denis Jones (FG) |
| 17th | 1961 | James Collins (FF) | Donnchadh Ó Briain (FF) | Denis Jones (FG) |
| 18th | 1965 | James Collins (FF) | Donnchadh Ó Briain (FF) | Denis Jones (FG) |
| 18th | 1967 by-election | Gerry Collins (FF) | Donnchadh Ó Briain (FF) | Denis Jones (FG) |
| 19th | 1969 | Gerry Collins (FF) | Michael J. Noonan (FF) | Denis Jones (FG) |
| 20th | 1973 | Gerry Collins (FF) | Michael J. Noonan (FF) | Denis Jones (FG) |
| 21st | 1977 | Gerry Collins (FF) | Michael J. Noonan (FF) | William O'Brien (FG) |
| 22nd | 1981 | Gerry Collins (FF) | Michael J. Noonan (FF) | William O'Brien (FG) |
| 23rd | 1982 (Feb) | Gerry Collins (FF) | Michael J. Noonan (FF) | William O'Brien (FG) |
| 24th | 1982 (Nov) | Gerry Collins (FF) | Michael J. Noonan (FF) | William O'Brien (FG) |
| 25th | 1987 | Gerry Collins (FF) | Michael J. Noonan (FF) | John McCoy (PDs) |
| 26th | 1989 | Gerry Collins (FF) | Michael J. Noonan (FF) | Michael Finucane (FG) |
| 27th | 1992 | Gerry Collins (FF) | Michael J. Noonan (FF) | Michael Finucane (FG) |
| 28th | 1997 | Michael Collins (FF) | Dan Neville (FG) | Michael Finucane (FG) |
| 29th | 2002 | Michael Collins (FF) | Dan Neville (FG) | John Cregan (FF) |
| 30th | 2007 | Niall Collins (FF) | Dan Neville (FG) | John Cregan (FF) |
| 31st | 2011 | Constituency abolished. See Limerick and Kerry North–West Limerick | | |
