= 1952 Waterford by-election =

By-election to the 14th Dáil

- 26 June 1952
- Turnout: 34,399 (76.8%)
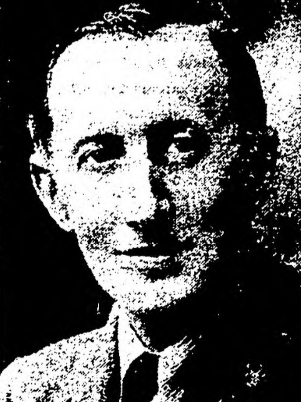
	Kenneally		Griffin
Nominee	William Kenneally	Thaddeus Lynch	John Griffin
Party	Fianna Fáil	Fine Gael	Labour
First preferences	15,532	11,714	7,153
Percentage	45.2%	34.1%	20.8%
Final count	17,005	16,448	–
TD before election
Bridget Redmond
Fine Gael
TD after election
William Kenneally
Fianna Fáil

A Dáil by-election was held in the constituency of Waterford in Ireland on Thursday, 26 June 1952, to fill a vacancy in the 14th Dáil. It followed the death of Fine Gael Teachta Dála (TD) Bridget Redmond on 3 May 1952. The writ of election to fill the vacancy was agreed by the Dáil on 5 June 1952.

The by-election was won by the Fianna Fáil candidate William Kenneally.

Two other by-elections were held on the same day; in Limerick East and Mayo North. The runner-up Thaddeus Lynch of Fine Gael, was elected for Waterford at the 1954 general election.

== Result ==
1952 Waterford by-election
Party	Candidate	FPv%	Count	
Party	Candidate	FPv%	1	2
Fianna Fáil	William Kenneally	45.2	15,532	17,005
Fine Gael	Thaddeus Lynch	34.1	11,714	16,448
Labour	John Griffin	20.8	7,153	
Electorate: 44,797 Valid: 34,399 Quota: 17,200 Turnout: 76.8%
