= 1966 Waterford by-election =

By-election to the 18th Dáil

- 7 December 1966
- Turnout: 28,581 (77.3%)
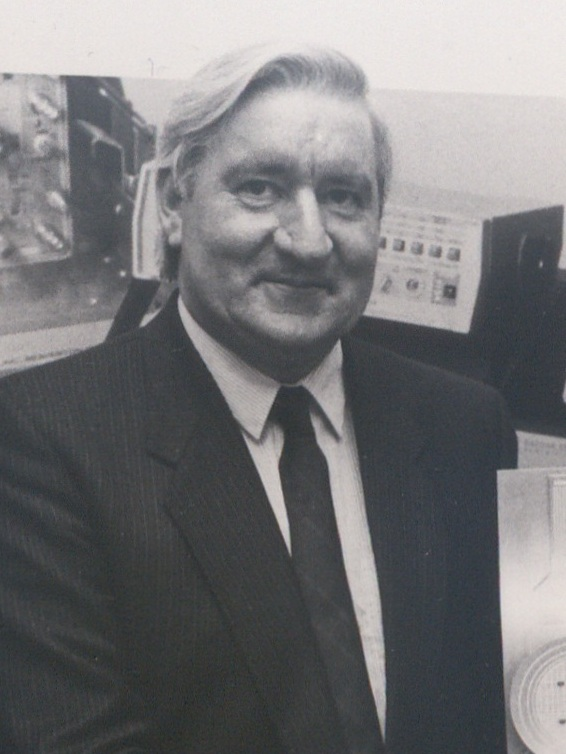
	Browne		Griffin
Nominee	Fad Browne	Edward Collins	John Griffin
Party	Fianna Fáil	Fine Gael	Labour
First preferences	12,181	9,617	6,783
Percentage	42.6%	33.7%	23.7%
Final count	13,853	13,178	–
TD before election
Thaddeus Lynch
Fine Gael
TD after election
Fad Browne
Fianna Fáil

A Dáil by-election was held in the constituency of Waterford in Ireland on Wednesday, 7 December 1966, to fill a vacancy in the 18th Dáil. It followed the death of Fine Gael Teachta Dála (TD) Thaddeus Lynch on 25 October 1966.

The writ of election to fill the vacancy was agreed by the Dáil on 17 November 1966.

The by-election was won by the Fianna Fáil candidate Fad Browne. It was held on the same day as the 1966 Kerry South by-election. Both by-elections were won by Fianna Fáil candidates.

== Result ==
1966 Waterford by-election
Party	Candidate	FPv%	Count	
Party	Candidate	FPv%	1	2
Fianna Fáil	Fad Browne	42.6	12,181	13,853
Fine Gael	Edward Collins	33.7	9,617	13,178
Labour	John Griffin	23.7	6,783	
Electorate: 36,986 Valid: 28,581 Quota: 14,291 Turnout: 77.3%
