= Brendan Kenneally =

Irish former politician (born 1955)

Teachta Dála
- In office May 2007 – February 2011
- In office June 1989 – May 2002
- Constituency: Waterford

Senator
- In office 12 September 2002 – 24 May 2007
- Constituency: Nominated by the Taoiseach

Minister of State
- 1992–1993: Tourism, Transport and Communications

Personal details
- Born: 1 April 1955 (age 71) Waterford, Ireland
- Party: Fianna Fáil
- Parent: Billy Kenneally (father)
- Relatives: William Kenneally (grandfather)
- Education: Waterford RTC

Brendan Kenneally (born 1 April 1955) is an Irish former Fianna Fáil politician. He was a Teachta Dála (TD) for the Waterford constituency, he was first elected to Dáil Éireann at the 1989 general election. In February 1992, he was appointed as Minister of State at the Department of Tourism, Transport and Communications by the Taoiseach Albert Reynolds, serving until January 1993. He was re-elected at subsequent elections until his defeat at the 2002 general election. He then became a member of the 22nd Seanad, nominated by the Taoiseach. He regained his Dáil seat at the 2007 general election.

Kenneally's father Billy Kenneally also served as a TD for Waterford from 1965 to 1982, and his grandfather William Kenneally served as a TD for Waterford from 1952 to 1961.

The Sunday Tribune reported that while a senator, between 2005 and 2007, Kenneally ran up total expenses amounting to €139,189. On 3 August 2009, the Irish Independent revealed that Kenneally was one of the TDs with the highest expense claims in Dáil Éireann in 2008. He claimed €73,857 in expenses. He lost his seat at the 2011 general election.

In 2016, after his cousin was convicted of 1980s sexual abuse of boys, Brendan Kenneally revealed that he had been approached in 2002 by one victim's family but had not informed the Garda because the victim did not want him to. This caused controversy in 2020 for Mary Butler, his successor as Waterford Fianna Fáil TD, who apologised for allowing him to canvass for her in the general election and for renting an office from him.

== See also ==
- Families in the Oireachtas

Political offices
Preceded by Denis Lyons; Frank Fahey	Minister for State at the Department of Tourism, Transport and Communications; 1992–1993	Succeeded by Noel Treacy as Minister of State at the Department of Transport, Energy and Communications

Dáil	Election	Deputy (Party)	Deputy (Party)	Deputy (Party)	Deputy (Party)
4th	1923	Caitlín Brugha (Rep)	John Butler (Lab)	Nicholas Wall (FP)	William Redmond (NL)
5th	1927 (Jun)	Caitlín Brugha (Rep)	Patrick Little (FF)	Vincent White (CnaG)	William Redmond (NL)
6th	1927 (Sep)	Seán Goulding (FF)	Patrick Little (FF)	Vincent White (CnaG)	William Redmond (NL)
7th	1932	Seán Goulding (FF)	Patrick Little (FF)	John Kiersey (CnaG)	William Redmond (CnaG)
8th	1933	Seán Goulding (FF)	Patrick Little (FF)	Nicholas Wall (NCP)	Bridget Redmond (CnaG)
9th	1937	Michael Morrissey (FF)	Patrick Little (FF)	Nicholas Wall (FG)	Bridget Redmond (FG)
10th	1938	Michael Morrissey (FF)	Patrick Little (FF)	William Broderick (FG)	Bridget Redmond (FG)
11th	1943	Michael Morrissey (FF)	Patrick Little (FF)	Denis Heskin (CnaT)	Bridget Redmond (FG)
12th	1944	Michael Morrissey (FF)	Patrick Little (FF)	Denis Heskin (CnaT)	Bridget Redmond (FG)
12th	1947 by-election	John Ormonde (FF)	Patrick Little (FF)	Denis Heskin (CnaT)	Bridget Redmond (FG)
13th	1948	John Ormonde (FF)	Patrick Little (FF)	Thomas Kyne (Lab)	Bridget Redmond (FG)
14th	1951	John Ormonde (FF)	Patrick Little (FF)	Thomas Kyne (Lab)	Bridget Redmond (FG)
14th	1952 by-election	John Ormonde (FF)	Patrick Little (FF)	Thomas Kyne (Lab)	William Kenneally (FF)
15th	1954	John Ormonde (FF)	Thaddeus Lynch (FG)	Thomas Kyne (Lab)	William Kenneally (FF)
16th	1957	John Ormonde (FF)	Thaddeus Lynch (FG)	Thomas Kyne (Lab)	William Kenneally (FF)
17th	1961	John Ormonde (FF)	Thaddeus Lynch (FG)	Thomas Kyne (Lab)	3 seats 1961–1977
18th	1965	Billy Kenneally (FF)	Thaddeus Lynch (FG)	Thomas Kyne (Lab)	3 seats 1961–1977
18th	1966 by-election	Billy Kenneally (FF)	Fad Browne (FF)	Thomas Kyne (Lab)	3 seats 1961–1977
19th	1969	Billy Kenneally (FF)	Fad Browne (FF)	Edward Collins (FG)	3 seats 1961–1977
20th	1973	Billy Kenneally (FF)	Thomas Kyne (Lab)	Edward Collins (FG)	3 seats 1961–1977
21st	1977	Billy Kenneally (FF)	Jackie Fahey (FF)	Edward Collins (FG)	Austin Deasy (FG)
22nd	1981	Billy Kenneally (FF)	Jackie Fahey (FF)	Edward Collins (FG)	Austin Deasy (FG)
23rd	1982 (Feb)	Paddy Gallagher (SF–WP)	Jackie Fahey (FF)	Edward Collins (FG)	Austin Deasy (FG)
24th	1982 (Nov)	Donal Ormonde (FF)	Jackie Fahey (FF)	Edward Collins (FG)	Austin Deasy (FG)
25th	1987	Martin Cullen (PDs)	Jackie Fahey (FF)	Brian Swift (FF)	Austin Deasy (FG)
26th	1989	Brian O'Shea (Lab)	Jackie Fahey (FF)	Brendan Kenneally (FF)	Austin Deasy (FG)
27th	1992	Brian O'Shea (Lab)	Martin Cullen (PDs)	Brendan Kenneally (FF)	Austin Deasy (FG)
28th	1997	Brian O'Shea (Lab)	Martin Cullen (FF)	Brendan Kenneally (FF)	Austin Deasy (FG)
29th	2002	Brian O'Shea (Lab)	Martin Cullen (FF)	Ollie Wilkinson (FF)	John Deasy (FG)
30th	2007	Brian O'Shea (Lab)	Martin Cullen (FF)	Brendan Kenneally (FF)	John Deasy (FG)
31st	2011	Ciara Conway (Lab)	John Halligan (Ind.)	Paudie Coffey (FG)	John Deasy (FG)
32nd	2016	David Cullinane (SF)	John Halligan (Ind.)	Mary Butler (FF)	John Deasy (FG)
33rd	2020	David Cullinane (SF)	Marc Ó Cathasaigh (GP)	Mary Butler (FF)	Matt Shanahan (Ind.)
34th	2024	David Cullinane (SF)	Conor D. McGuinness (SF)	Mary Butler (FF)	John Cummins (FG)
