= 1967 Cork Borough by-election =

By-election to the 18th Dáil

- 9 November 1967
- Turnout: 39,126 (66.3%)
	French	Burke	Dwyer
Nominee	Seán French	Liam Burke	Patrick Kerrigan
Party	Fianna Fáil	Fine Gael	Labour
First preferences	18,417	10,272	9,622
Percentage	47.1%	26.3%	24.6%
Final count	20,854	14,586	–
TD before election
Seán Casey
Labour
TD after election
Seán French
Fianna Fáil

A Dáil by-election was held in the constituency of Cork Borough in Ireland on Thursday, 9 November 1967, to fill a vacancy in the 18th Dáil. It followed the death of Labour Teachta Dála (TD) Seán Casey on 29 April 1967.

The writ of election to fill the vacancy was agreed by the Dáil on 18 October 1967.

The by-election was won by the Fianna Fáil candidate Seán French. It was held on the same day as the 1967 Limerick West by-election. Both by-elections were won by Fianna Fáil candidates.

== Result ==
1967 Cork Borough by-election
Party	Candidate	FPv%	Count		
Party	Candidate	FPv%	1	2	3
Fianna Fáil	Seán French	47.1	18,417	18,584	20,854
Fine Gael	Liam Burke	26.3	10,272	10,495	14,586
Labour	Patrick Kerrigan	24.6	9,622	9,897	
Independent	Eoin O'Mahony	2.1	815		
Electorate: 59,019 Valid: 39,126 Quota: 19,564 Turnout: 66.3%
