= Godfrey Timmins =

Irish Fine Gael politician (1927–2001)

Teachta Dála
- In office June 1989 – June 1997
- In office April 1968 – February 1987
- Constituency: Wicklow

Personal details
- Born: Michael Godfrey Timmins; 6 September 1927 Baltinglass, County Wicklow, Ireland
- Died: 11 April 2001 (aged 73) County Wicklow, Ireland
- Party: Fine Gael
- Children: Billy Timmins (son); Edward Timmins (son)

Michael Godfrey Timmins (6 September 1927 – 11 April 2001) was an Irish Fine Gael politician who served in Dáil Éireann from 1968 to 1987 and from 1989 to 1997.

== Early and personal life ==
Born in Weaver's Square, Baltinglass, County Wicklow, he was the eldest of four children. His father had been a Sinn Féin representative on the Baltinglass Board of Guardians, one of three Benchmen in the Republican court during the Irish War of Independence, a pro-Treaty Cumann na nGaedheal supporter, and later a Fine Gael Councillor. His mother Kitty (née Godfrey) was a native of Ballyhaunis, County Mayo. He was known by his mother's maiden surname, Godfrey, to distinguish him from his father.

He attended secondary school at the Patrician College, Tullow and later at Naas Christian Brothers School. After finishing school he worked in the family business and as a farmer and butcher in Baltinglass.

He was a keen Gaelic footballer. In 1946 he was the Baltinglass club delegate to the Wicklow County GAA Board. He served as chairperson of the local club from 1952 to 1970 and club president from 1971 until his death in 2001.

== Political career ==
Timmins became active in politics with Fine Gael. In the local elections of 1950 he succeeded in being the only Fine Gael candidate elected to Wicklow County Council. He was re-elected at each subsequent local election, and was a member of the council for 49 years. He held the position of chairperson on the Council on four occasions (1975, 1978, 1981 and 1996).

He also served on the county council's committee on Agriculture, Wicklow VEC and the Eastern Health Board.

Timmins was elected to the 18th Dáil as a Fine Gael Teachta Dála (TD) for the Wicklow constituency at the 1968 Wicklow by-election caused by the death of Labour Party TD James Everett. He was re-elected at each subsequent general election until he lost in 1987. Refusing to stand for the Seanad, he regained his seat at the next general election and remained as a TD until he retired at the 1997 general election. He was succeeded in Dáil Éireann by his son Billy Timmins. Another son Edward Timmins was elected for the Wicklow constituency at the 2024 general election.

During his time in the Dáil he served as a member of the Committee on Procedure and Privileges, the Committee of Selection and the Committee of Accounts. He was Fine Gael Chief Whip from 1972 to 1973.

He collapsed and died while attending a GAA match in Dunlavin in April 2001. He left an estate worth €3.5m in 2003.

== See also ==
- Families in the Oireachtas

Dáil	Election	Deputy (Party)	Deputy (Party)	Deputy (Party)	Deputy (Party)	Deputy (Party)
4th	1923	Christopher Byrne (CnaG)	James Everett (Lab)	Richard Wilson (FP)	3 seats 1923–1981	
5th	1927 (Jun)	Séamus Moore (FF)	James Everett (Lab)	Dermot O'Mahony (CnaG)	3 seats 1923–1981	
6th	1927 (Sep)	Séamus Moore (FF)	James Everett (Lab)	Dermot O'Mahony (CnaG)	3 seats 1923–1981	
7th	1932	Séamus Moore (FF)	James Everett (Lab)	Dermot O'Mahony (CnaG)	3 seats 1923–1981	
8th	1933	Séamus Moore (FF)	James Everett (Lab)	Dermot O'Mahony (CnaG)	3 seats 1923–1981	
9th	1937	Séamus Moore (FF)	James Everett (Lab)	Dermot O'Mahony (FG)	3 seats 1923–1981	
10th	1938	Séamus Moore (FF)	James Everett (Lab)	Patrick Cogan (Ind.)	3 seats 1923–1981	
11th	1943	Christopher Byrne (FF)	James Everett (Lab)	Patrick Cogan (CnaT)	3 seats 1923–1981	
12th	1944	Thomas Brennan (FF)	James Everett (NLP)	Patrick Cogan (CnaT)	3 seats 1923–1981	
13th	1948	Thomas Brennan (FF)	James Everett (NLP)	Patrick Cogan (Ind.)	3 seats 1923–1981	
14th	1951	Thomas Brennan (FF)	James Everett (Lab)	Patrick Cogan (Ind.)	3 seats 1923–1981	
14th	1953 by-election	Mark Deering (FG)	James Everett (Lab)	Patrick Cogan (Ind.)	3 seats 1923–1981	
15th	1954	Mark Deering (FG)	James Everett (Lab)	Paudge Brennan (FF)	3 seats 1923–1981	
16th	1957	James O'Toole (FF)	James Everett (Lab)	Paudge Brennan (FF)	3 seats 1923–1981	
17th	1961	Michael O'Higgins (FG)	James Everett (Lab)	Paudge Brennan (FF)	3 seats 1923–1981	
18th	1965	Michael O'Higgins (FG)	James Everett (Lab)	Paudge Brennan (FF)	3 seats 1923–1981	
18th	1968 by-election	Michael O'Higgins (FG)	Godfrey Timmins (FG)	Paudge Brennan (FF)	3 seats 1923–1981	
19th	1969	Liam Kavanagh (Lab)	Godfrey Timmins (FG)	Paudge Brennan (FF)	3 seats 1923–1981	
20th	1973	Liam Kavanagh (Lab)	Godfrey Timmins (FG)	Ciarán Murphy (FF)	3 seats 1923–1981	
21st	1977	Liam Kavanagh (Lab)	Godfrey Timmins (FG)	Ciarán Murphy (FF)	3 seats 1923–1981	
22nd	1981	Liam Kavanagh (Lab)	Godfrey Timmins (FG)	Ciarán Murphy (FF)	Paudge Brennan (FF)	4 seats 1981–1992
23rd	1982 (Feb)	Liam Kavanagh (Lab)	Godfrey Timmins (FG)	Ciarán Murphy (FF)	Gemma Hussey (FG)	4 seats 1981–1992
24th	1982 (Nov)	Liam Kavanagh (Lab)	Godfrey Timmins (FG)	Paudge Brennan (FF)	Gemma Hussey (FG)	4 seats 1981–1992
25th	1987	Liam Kavanagh (Lab)	Joe Jacob (FF)	Dick Roche (FF)	Gemma Hussey (FG)	4 seats 1981–1992
26th	1989	Liam Kavanagh (Lab)	Joe Jacob (FF)	Dick Roche (FF)	Godfrey Timmins (FG)	4 seats 1981–1992
27th	1992	Liam Kavanagh (Lab)	Joe Jacob (FF)	Liz McManus (DL)	Godfrey Timmins (FG)	Johnny Fox (Ind.)
27th	1995 by-election	Liam Kavanagh (Lab)	Joe Jacob (FF)	Liz McManus (DL)	Godfrey Timmins (FG)	Mildred Fox (Ind.)
28th	1997	Dick Roche (FF)	Joe Jacob (FF)	Liz McManus (DL)	Billy Timmins (FG)	Mildred Fox (Ind.)
29th	2002	Dick Roche (FF)	Joe Jacob (FF)	Liz McManus (Lab)	Billy Timmins (FG)	Mildred Fox (Ind.)
30th	2007	Dick Roche (FF)	Joe Behan (FF)	Liz McManus (Lab)	Billy Timmins (FG)	Andrew Doyle (FG)
31st	2011	Simon Harris (FG)	Stephen Donnelly (Ind.)	Anne Ferris (Lab)	Billy Timmins (FG)	Andrew Doyle (FG)
32nd	2016	Simon Harris (FG)	Stephen Donnelly (SD)	John Brady (SF)	Pat Casey (FF)	Andrew Doyle (FG)
33rd	2020	Simon Harris (FG)	Stephen Donnelly (FF)	John Brady (SF)	Jennifer Whitmore (SD)	Steven Matthews (GP)
34th	2024	Simon Harris (FG)	Edward Timmins (FG)	John Brady (SF)	Jennifer Whitmore (SD)	4 seats since 2024
