= Gerry Collins (politician) =

Irish politician (1938–2026)

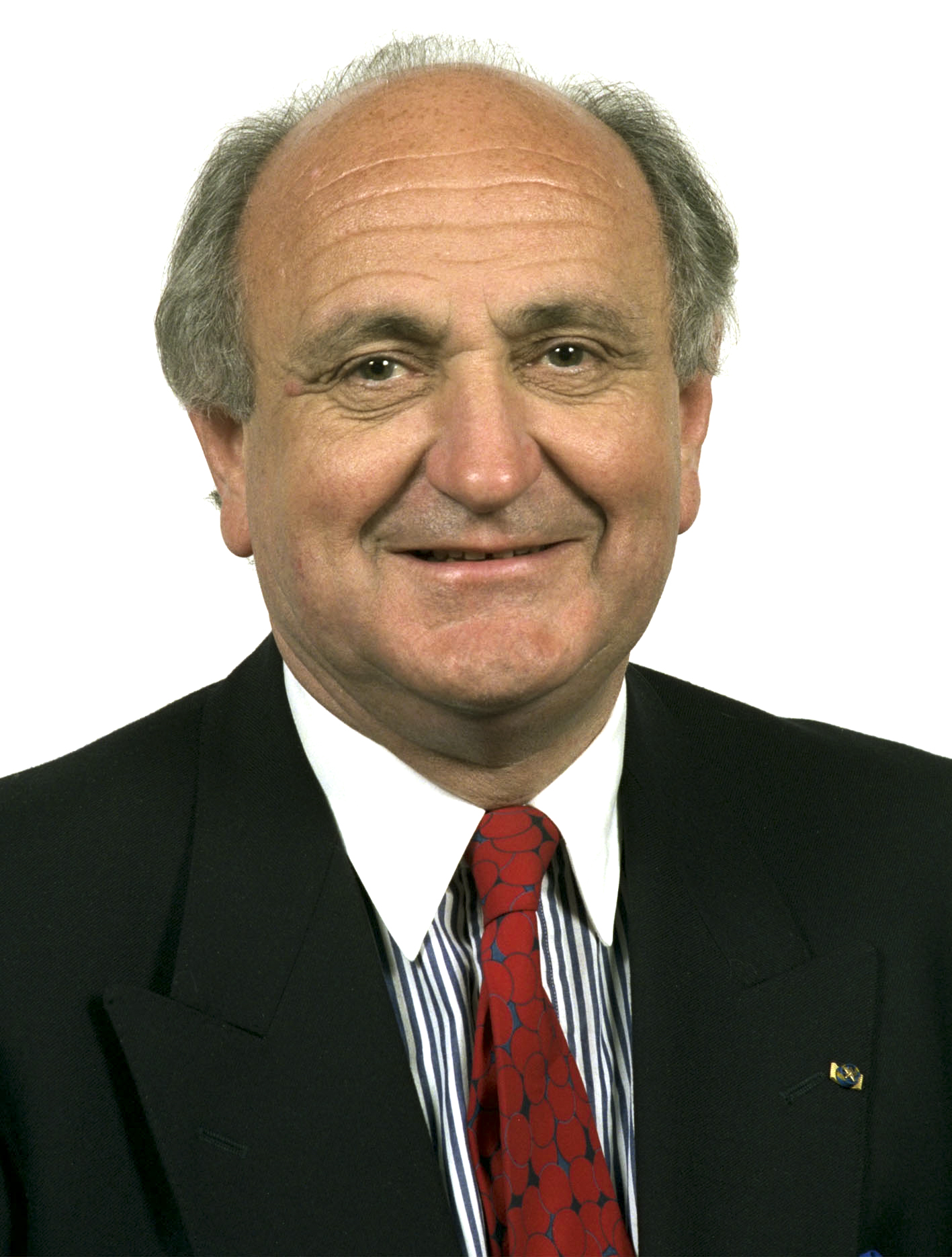
- Collins in 1994

Minister for Foreign Affairs
- In office 12 July 1989 – 11 February 1992
- Taoiseach: Charles Haughey
- Preceded by: Brian Lenihan
- Succeeded by: David Andrews
- In office 9 March 1982 – 14 December 1982
- Taoiseach: Charles Haughey
- Preceded by: James Dooge
- Succeeded by: Peter Barry

Minister for Justice
- In office 10 March 1987 – 12 July 1989
- Taoiseach: Charles Haughey
- Preceded by: Alan Dukes
- Succeeded by: Ray Burke
- In office 5 July 1977 – 30 June 1981
- Taoiseach: Jack Lynch; Charles Haughey
- Preceded by: Patrick Cooney
- Succeeded by: Jim Mitchell

Minister for Posts and Telegraphs
- In office 9 May 1970 – 14 March 1973
- Taoiseach: Jack Lynch
- Preceded by: Patrick Lalor
- Succeeded by: Conor Cruise O'Brien

Parliamentary Secretary
- 1969–1970: Industry and Commerce
- 1969–1970: Gaeltacht

Member of the European Parliament
- In office June 1994 – June 2004
- Constituency: Munster

Teachta Dála
- In office November 1967 – June 1997
- Constituency: Limerick West

Personal details
- Born: James Gerard Collins; 16 October 1938 Limerick, Ireland
- Died: 1 November 2026 (aged 88) Tralee, Ireland
- Party: Fianna Fáil
- Relations: Michael Collins (brother); Niall Collins (nephew)
- Parent: James Collins (father)
- Education: University College Dublin

James Gerard Collins (16 October 1938 – 1 November 2026) was an Irish Fianna Fáil politician who served as government minister in various governments between 1970 and 1992. He was a Member of the European Parliament (MEP) for Munster from 1994 to 2004 and a TD for Limerick West from 1967 to 1997.

== Early life ==
Collins was born in Abbeyfeale, County Limerick, on 16 October 1938. The son of James Collins, his father was a onetime adjutant of the West Limerick Brigade of the Irish Republican Army during the Irish War of Independence. The father took the republican side during the subsequent Civil War. A quarter of a century later, James Collins was elected to Dáil Éireann at the 1948 general election as Fianna Fáil TD for Limerick West.

He was educated at St. Ita's College in Abbeyfeale before later attending the Patrician College, Ballyfin. Following the completion of his secondary schooling, he attended University College Dublin, where he became secretary of the Kevin Barry Cumann of Fianna Fáil. He ran for Student Union president, but was defeated by Brendan Ó Cathaoir. Collins subsequently worked as a vocational school teacher.

== Political career ==
Collins first became involved in politics in 1965, when he was appointed assistant general secretary of Fianna Fáil. Following the death of his father in 1967, he was elected to Dáil Éireann for Limerick West in the subsequent by-election. He was also co-opted onto Limerick County Council and various other local committees.

Following Fianna Fáil's re-election at the 1969 general election, Collins was appointed as a Parliamentary Secretary to Minister for the Gaeltacht and Parliamentary Secretary to Minister for Industry and Commerce, where he largely held the responsibility for the promotion of Gaeltacht affairs and the Irish language.

=== Minister for Posts and Telegraphs (1970–1973) ===
In the wake of the Arms Crisis in 1970, a major reshuffle of the cabinet took place. Four ministers, Charles Haughey, Neil Blaney, Kevin Boland and Mícheál Ó Móráin, were either sacked, resigned or retired from the government, due to the scandal that was about to take place. Collins was appointed Minister for Posts and Telegraphs. It was a tough time for Fianna Fáil, as the party nearly faced a split due to disagreements over its Northern Ireland policy. Collins, despite coming from a strong republican background, remained loyal to Taoiseach Jack Lynch in his moderate approach to the Northern Ireland situation.

During his tenure as a minister, Collins made an order under section 31 of the Broadcasting Act which prohibited organisations committed to violence, such as the IRA, from making media broadcasts. On 19 November 1972, an interview with Seán Mac Stíofáin, Chief of Staff of the Irish Republican Army, was broadcast on the RTÉ This Week radio programme. Mac Stíofáin was arrested on the same day and the interview was later used as evidence against him on a trial of IRA membership, and on 25 November, he was sentenced to six months imprisonment by the Special Criminal Court in Dublin. Political fallout arising from the interview was considerable and some days later, Collins sacked the entire RTÉ Authority as he felt that they disobeyed his order.

In 1973, Fianna Fáil was ousted after sixteen years in government, as the National Coalition of Fine Gael and the Labour Party took office. Collins was retained on Jack Lynch's new front bench as Spokesperson for Agriculture. After two years in that position, he was promoted to Spokesperson for Justice in a front bench reshuffle in 1975. In this capacity, he was highly critical of the government's management of the Garda Síochána.

=== Minister for Justice (1977–1981) ===
Fianna Fáil returned to office with a huge 20-seat Dáil majority following the 1977 general election. Collins, at thirty-eight years of age, was one of the youngest members of Jack Lynch's new cabinet and was appointed Minister for Justice. Despite the sensitive nature of the portfolio, he was viewed as a safe pair of hands. He had a good working relationship with the Garda Síochána, primarily due to his establishment of the Ryan tribunal, which saw all ranks receive huge pay increases in his first year in office.

In December 1979, Jack Lynch resigned as Taoiseach and as Fianna Fáil leader. The succession resulted in a straight contest between Charles Haughey and George Colley. The latter had the backing of the majority of the existing cabinet, including Collins; however, a backbench revolt saw Haughey become Taoiseach. Collins, much to his disappointment, was retained in his existing position as Minister for Justice, holding office until Fianna Fáil lost power following the 1981 general election.

=== Minister for Foreign Affairs (1982) ===
The Fine Gael–Labour government was short-lived and Fianna Fáil returned to power, following the February 1982 general election. Collins was appoointed as Minister for Foreign Affairs in Haughey's second cabinet. One of the major incidents of his tenure at Iveagh House was the outbreak of the Falklands War. Although Anglo-Irish relations were at an all-time low, Collins opposed the act of aggression by the Argentinian government at United Nations and EEC levels.

The Fianna Fáil government fell in October 1982 and Collins's party were out of power following the November 1982 general election. A period of instability followed within Fianna Fáil as several TDs attempted to oust Charles Haughey as party leader. Desmond O'Malley was seen as the clear front-runner to succeed Haughey; however, Collins's name was also mentioned alongside former European Commissioner Michael O'Kennedy. In the end, Haughey survived as party leader, after being told at a meeting of the parliamentary party by Collins that Fianna Fáil had lost credibility due to his continued leadership. Despite this, he was subsequently appointed front bench spokesperson on Foreign Affairs on the new front bench.

=== Minister for Justice/Foreign Affairs (1987–1992) ===
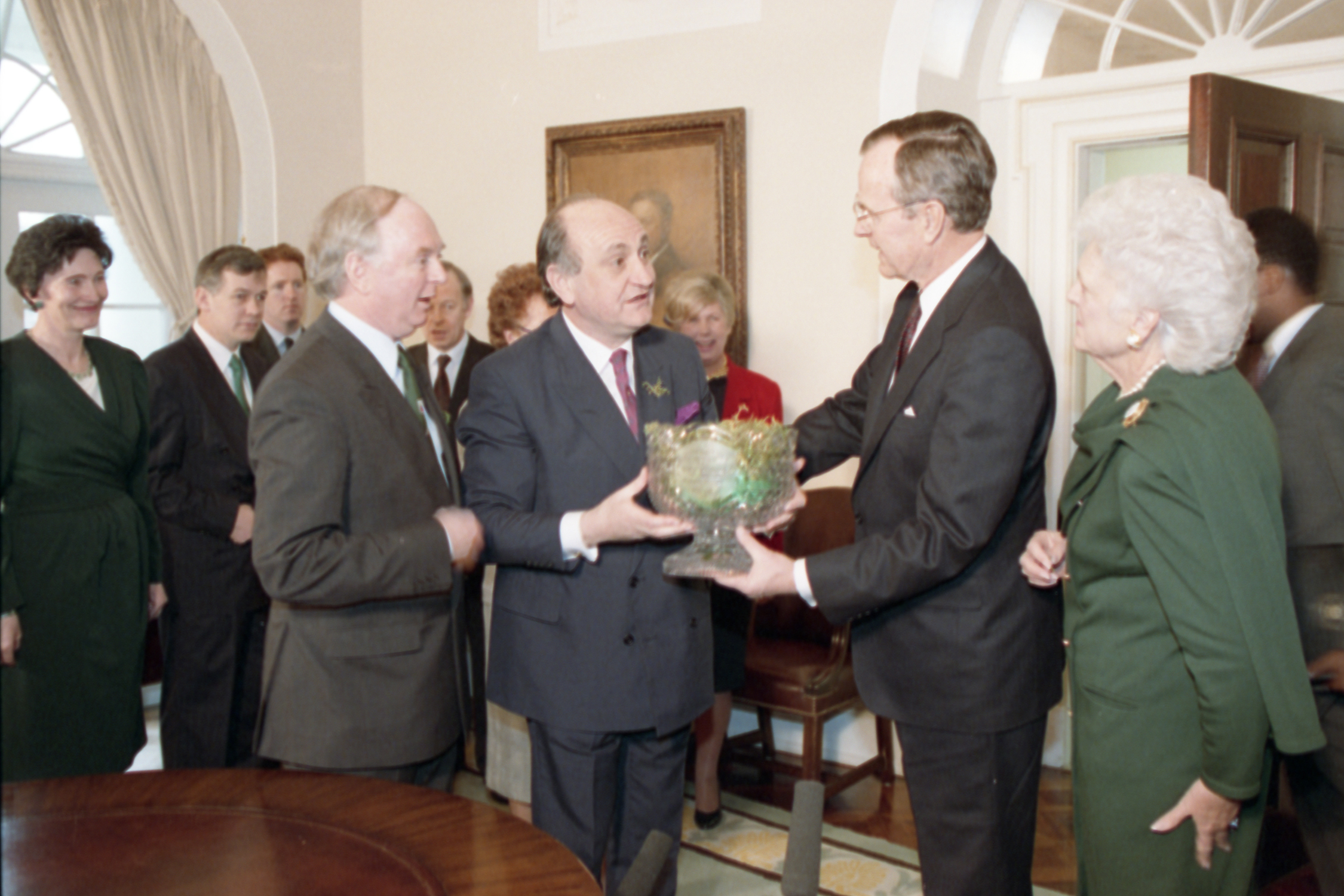
President George H. W. Bush receives a bowl of Shamrocks from Collins in March 1991

Following the 1987 general election, Fianna Fáil returned to office as a minority government. Collins was again appointed as Minister for Justice. Fianna Fáil retained power following the 1989 general election, albeit in a coalition government with the Progressive Democrats. Collins returned to the cabinet as Minister for Foreign Affairs. From January to June 1990, he oversaw Ireland's Presidency of the Council of the European Communities. This was largely seen as a very successful presidency for the Irish government and was a personal triumph for Collins.

In 1991, tensions began to surface within Fianna Fáil regarding the continued leadership of Charles Haughey. Minister for Finance Albert Reynolds was the main challenger; however, he had little support from his cabinet colleagues. In an interview on the Six One News, Collins made a plea to Reynolds asking him not to challenge Haughey for the leadership of the Fianna Fáil party: "This is going to wreck our party right down the centre and it's going to burst up government". The incident was much parodied, particularly by Dermot Morgan later that year. Reynolds's leadership challenge failed on that occasion and Haughey survived.

In February 1992, Haughey resigned as Taoiseach and Fianna Fáil leader. Reynolds immediately threw his hat in the ring in the ensuing leadership contest. Collins contemplated running in the leadership race after several approaches from his colleagues; however, in the end, he declined to stand. Reynolds won the subsequent leadership election by a large majority. The formation of his new cabinet caused widespread shock as Collins and seven of his cabinet colleagues were effectively sacked in favour of supporters of the new Taoiseach. This effectively brought Collins's domestic career in politics to an end.

=== Member of the European Parliament (1994–2004) ===
In 1994, Collins was elected as an MEP for Munster. He retired from domestic politics at the 1997 general election, being succeeded by his brother, Michael J. Collins. Collins was re-elected to the European Parliament in 1999 but lost his bid for another term at the 2004 European Parliament elections. After this defeat, he announced his retirement from politics.

== Death ==
Collins died at a hospice in Tralee, County Kerry, on 1 November 2026, at the age of 88.

Political offices
New office	Parliamentary Secretary to the Minister for the Gaeltacht; 1969–1970	Succeeded by Michael F. Kitt
New office	Parliamentary Secretary to the Minister for Industry and Commerce; 1969–1970	Office abolished
Preceded by Patrick Lalor	Minister for Posts and Telegraphs; 1970–1973	Succeeded by Conor Cruise O'Brien
Preceded by Patrick Cooney	Minister for Justice; 1977–1981	Succeeded by Jim Mitchell
Preceded by James Dooge	Minister for Foreign Affairs; 1982	Succeeded by Peter Barry
Preceded by Alan Dukes	Minister for Justice; 1987–1989	Succeeded by Ray Burke
Preceded by Brian Lenihan	Minister for Foreign Affairs; 1989–1992	Succeeded by David Andrews

Dáil	Election	Deputy (Party)	Deputy (Party)	Deputy (Party)
13th	1948	James Collins (FF)	Donnchadh Ó Briain (FF)	David Madden (FG)
14th	1951	James Collins (FF)	Donnchadh Ó Briain (FF)	David Madden (FG)
15th	1954	James Collins (FF)	Donnchadh Ó Briain (FF)	David Madden (FG)
15th	1955 by-election	James Collins (FF)	Donnchadh Ó Briain (FF)	Michael Colbert (FF)
16th	1957	James Collins (FF)	Donnchadh Ó Briain (FF)	Denis Jones (FG)
17th	1961	James Collins (FF)	Donnchadh Ó Briain (FF)	Denis Jones (FG)
18th	1965	James Collins (FF)	Donnchadh Ó Briain (FF)	Denis Jones (FG)
18th	1967 by-election	Gerry Collins (FF)	Donnchadh Ó Briain (FF)	Denis Jones (FG)
19th	1969	Gerry Collins (FF)	Michael J. Noonan (FF)	Denis Jones (FG)
20th	1973	Gerry Collins (FF)	Michael J. Noonan (FF)	Denis Jones (FG)
21st	1977	Gerry Collins (FF)	Michael J. Noonan (FF)	William O'Brien (FG)
22nd	1981	Gerry Collins (FF)	Michael J. Noonan (FF)	William O'Brien (FG)
23rd	1982 (Feb)	Gerry Collins (FF)	Michael J. Noonan (FF)	William O'Brien (FG)
24th	1982 (Nov)	Gerry Collins (FF)	Michael J. Noonan (FF)	William O'Brien (FG)
25th	1987	Gerry Collins (FF)	Michael J. Noonan (FF)	John McCoy (PDs)
26th	1989	Gerry Collins (FF)	Michael J. Noonan (FF)	Michael Finucane (FG)
27th	1992	Gerry Collins (FF)	Michael J. Noonan (FF)	Michael Finucane (FG)
28th	1997	Michael Collins (FF)	Dan Neville (FG)	Michael Finucane (FG)
29th	2002	Michael Collins (FF)	Dan Neville (FG)	John Cregan (FF)
30th	2007	Niall Collins (FF)	Dan Neville (FG)	John Cregan (FF)
31st	2011	Constituency abolished. See Limerick and Kerry North–West Limerick		
