= 1968 Clare by-election =

By-election to the 18th Dáil

- 14 March 1968
- Turnout: 32,471 (67.4%)
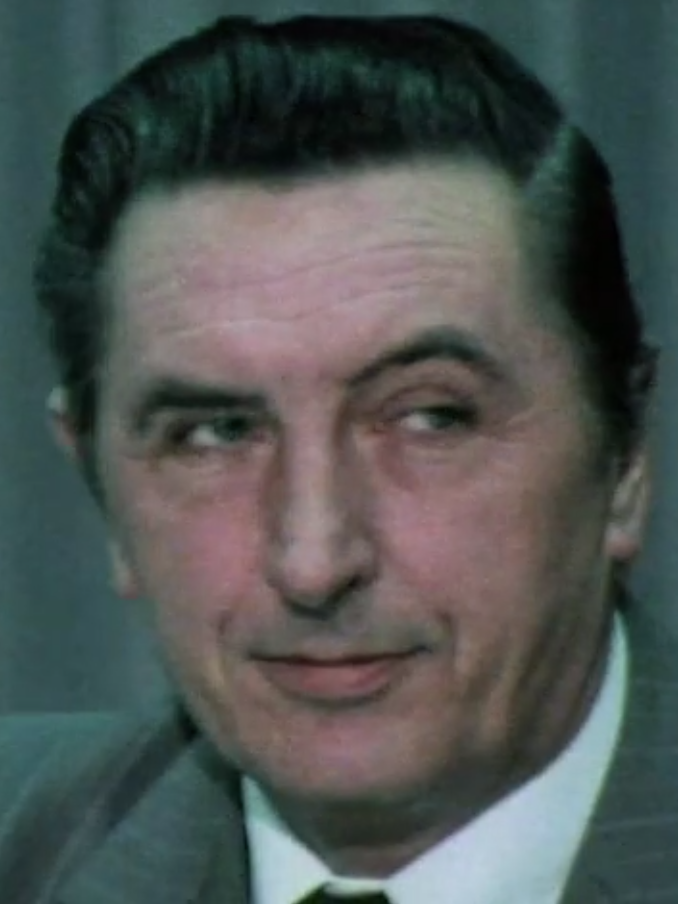
| | | Bugler | Honan |
| Nominee | Sylvester Barrett | Patrick Bugler | Flan Honan |
| Party | Fianna Fáil | Fine Gael | Labour |
| First preferences | 19,066 | 9,313 | 3,799 |
| Percentage | 58.7% | 28.7% | 11.7% |
| Final count | – | 10,407 | 5,177 |
TD before election
William Murphy
Fine Gael
TD after election
Sylvester Barrett
Fianna Fáil

A Dáil by-election was held in the constituency of Clare in Ireland on Thursday, 14 March 1968, to fill a vacancy in the 18th Dáil. It followed the death of Fine Gael Teachta Dála (TD) William Murphy on 16 November 1967.

The writ of election to fill the vacancy was agreed by the Dáil on 21 February 1968.

The by-election was won by the Fianna Fáil candidate Sylvester Barrett. It was held on the same day as the 1968 Wicklow by-election.

The surplus votes of Barrett were distributed after he was declared elected, because there was a possibility another candidate could have reached the threshold of a third of a quota. This would have meant their election deposit was returned to them.

== Result ==
1968 Clare by-election
| Party | Candidate | FPv% | Count | |
| Party | Candidate | FPv% | 1 | 2 |
|---|---|---|---|---|
| Fianna Fáil | Sylvester Barrett | 58.7 | 19,066 | |
| Fine Gael | Patrick Bugler | 28.7 | 9,313 | 10,407 |
| Labour | Flan Honan | 11.7 | 3,799 | 5,177 |
| Independent | Jean Grace | 0.9 | 293 | 651 |
Electorate: 48,182 Valid: 32,471 Quota: 16,236 Turnout: 67.4%
