= James Collins (Irish politician) =

Irish politician (1900–1967)

Teachta Dála
- In office February 1948 – 1 September 1967
- Constituency: Limerick West

Personal details
- Born: 30 October 1900 Abbeyfeale, County Limerick, Ireland
- Died: 1 September 1967 (aged 66) Abbeyfeale, County Limerick, Ireland
- Party: Fianna Fáil
- Spouse: Margaret Collins (m. 1930)
- Children: 5, including Gerry and Michael
- Relatives: Niall Collins (grandson)

Military service
- Allegiance: Irish Volunteers; Irish Republican Army; Anti-Treaty IRA
- Years of service: 1919–1923
- Battles/wars: Irish War of Independence; Irish Civil War

James John Collins (30 October 1900 – 1 September 1967) was an Irish Fianna Fáil politician who served as a Teachta Dála (TD) for the Limerick West constituency from 1948 to 1967.

== Revolutionary period ==
He joined the Irish Volunteers in 1915. During the Irish War of Independence, Collins took part in several attacks and operations against British forces. He served as Brigade Adjutant, West Limerick Brigade, Irish Republican Army (IRA) and Column Commander of the brigade's 2nd Battalion Active Service Unit. After the Anglo-Irish Treaty, he was Officer Commanding of the IRA garrison occupying Newcastle West Royal Irish Constabulary barracks and fought on the anti-Treaty side in the Irish Civil War.

He was arrested in September 1922 but escaped from custody after one week, was recaptured in December 1922 but escaped again in March 1923. Collins was 'on the run' until May 1924. Collins was later awarded a pension by the Irish government under the Military Service Pensions Act, 1934 for his service with the Irish Volunteers and the IRA between 1918 and 1923.

== Politics ==
On the cessation of hostilities, he worked as a farmer and a rate collector for Limerick County Council. He was a founder member of Fianna Fáil. He was first elected to Dáil Éireann as a Fianna Fáil TD for the Limerick West constituency at the 1948 general election and re-elected at each election until his death in 1967. He was succeeded in the by-election of November 1967, by his son Gerry Collins. Another son, Michael J. Collins was later elected for the same constituency. His grandson Niall Collins, has served as a TD for Limerick County since 2011.

== See also ==
- Families in the Oireachtas

Dáil	Election	Deputy (Party)	Deputy (Party)	Deputy (Party)
13th	1948	James Collins (FF)	Donnchadh Ó Briain (FF)	David Madden (FG)
14th	1951	James Collins (FF)	Donnchadh Ó Briain (FF)	David Madden (FG)
15th	1954	James Collins (FF)	Donnchadh Ó Briain (FF)	David Madden (FG)
15th	1955 by-election	James Collins (FF)	Donnchadh Ó Briain (FF)	Michael Colbert (FF)
16th	1957	James Collins (FF)	Donnchadh Ó Briain (FF)	Denis Jones (FG)
17th	1961	James Collins (FF)	Donnchadh Ó Briain (FF)	Denis Jones (FG)
18th	1965	James Collins (FF)	Donnchadh Ó Briain (FF)	Denis Jones (FG)
18th	1967 by-election	Gerry Collins (FF)	Donnchadh Ó Briain (FF)	Denis Jones (FG)
19th	1969	Gerry Collins (FF)	Michael J. Noonan (FF)	Denis Jones (FG)
20th	1973	Gerry Collins (FF)	Michael J. Noonan (FF)	Denis Jones (FG)
21st	1977	Gerry Collins (FF)	Michael J. Noonan (FF)	William O'Brien (FG)
22nd	1981	Gerry Collins (FF)	Michael J. Noonan (FF)	William O'Brien (FG)
23rd	1982 (Feb)	Gerry Collins (FF)	Michael J. Noonan (FF)	William O'Brien (FG)
24th	1982 (Nov)	Gerry Collins (FF)	Michael J. Noonan (FF)	William O'Brien (FG)
25th	1987	Gerry Collins (FF)	Michael J. Noonan (FF)	John McCoy (PDs)
26th	1989	Gerry Collins (FF)	Michael J. Noonan (FF)	Michael Finucane (FG)
27th	1992	Gerry Collins (FF)	Michael J. Noonan (FF)	Michael Finucane (FG)
28th	1997	Michael Collins (FF)	Dan Neville (FG)	Michael Finucane (FG)
29th	2002	Michael Collins (FF)	Dan Neville (FG)	John Cregan (FF)
30th	2007	Niall Collins (FF)	Dan Neville (FG)	John Cregan (FF)
31st	2011	Constituency abolished. See Limerick and Kerry North–West Limerick		
