= Sylvester Barrett =

Irish politician (1926–2002)

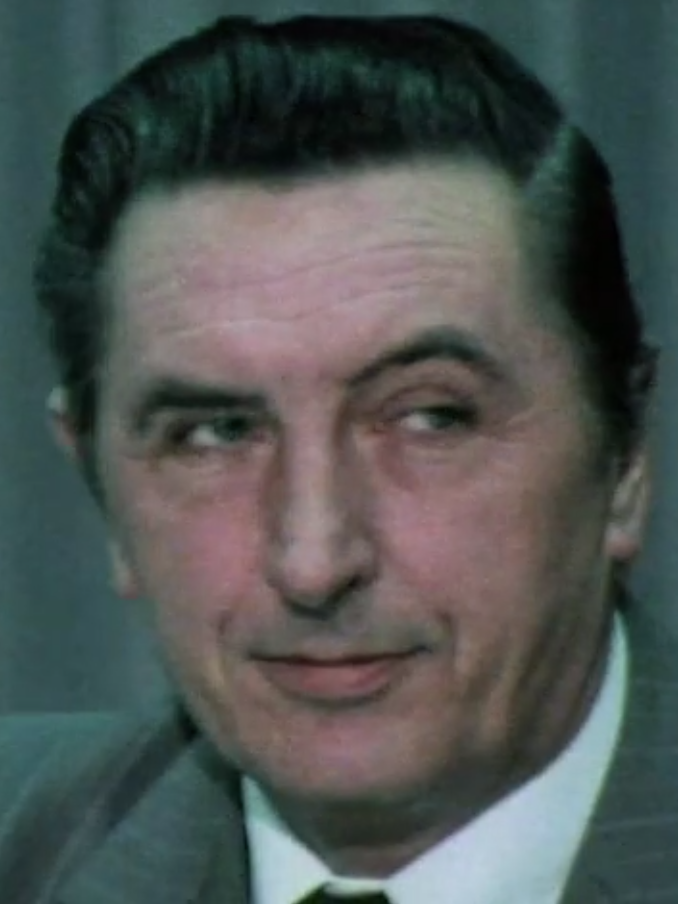
- Barrett in 1979

Minister for Defence
- In office 15 October 1980 – 30 June 1981
- Preceded by: Pádraig Faulkner
- Succeeded by: James Tully

Minister for the Environment
- In office 5 July 1977 – 15 October 1980
- Preceded by: James Tully
- Succeeded by: Ray Burke

Minister of State
- Mar.–Dec. 1982: Finance

Teachta Dála
- In office March 1968 – February 1987
- Constituency: Clare

Member of European Parliament
- In office June 1984 – June 1989
- Constituency: Munster

Personal details
- Born: 18 May 1926 County Clare, Ireland
- Died: 8 May 2002 (aged 75) County Clare, Ireland
- Party: Fianna Fáil
- Spouse: Mary Tubridy (m. 1952)
- Children: 4
- Education: University College Galway (attended)

Military service
- Allegiance: Ireland
- Branch/service: Irish Army
- Rank: Cadet

Sylvester Aidan Barrett (18 May 1926 – 8 May 2002) was an Irish Fianna Fáil politician. He served under Jack Lynch and Charles Haughey as Minister for the Environment (1977–1980) and Minister for Defence (1980–1981).

== Biography ==
Sylvester Barrett was born in Darragh, near Ennis, County Clare, in 1926. His father Frank, who was a founder-member of Fianna Fáil, and his mother Delia Costello, both died in 1931. As a result, he was raised by an uncle and aunt. His brother Fergus (Patrick) Barrett OFM, became a Franciscan priest, and founding rector of St John Vianney Seminary, Pretoria, South Africa. Barrett was educated at Ballyea National School and St Flannan's College in Ennis. He studied engineering at University College Galway, though did not complete his studies. He was a cadet in the Irish Army and later worked as a rate collector and an auctioneer.

He was elected to Dáil Éireann on 14 March 1968 at the by-election in the Clare constituency, held following the death of Fine Gael TD William Murphy. Barrett topped the poll at the general election the following year. At the 1973 general election Fianna Fáil lost office to a Fine Gael–Labour Party coalition government under Liam Cosgrave, and Barrett was appointed to the party's front bench as spokesperson on Transport and Power. After Fianna Fáil's landslide victory at the 1977 general election he was appointed to the cabinet as Minister for the Environment.

Barrett supported George Colley in the 1979 Fianna Fáil leadership election. Charles Haughey was the eventual victor, but Barrett was retained in the cabinet in the Environment position. Following a reshuffle in 1980 he was appointed Minister for Defence. After the February 1982 general election Fianna Fáil were returned to office, but Barrett was not appointed to cabinet. However, he was appointed a Minister of State at the Department of Finance.

In October 1982, when Charlie McCreevy put down a motion of no confidence in Haughey's leadership, Barrett was the only Minister of State among the so-called Gang of 22 who supported it; Haughey survived, and did not dismiss Barrett from office.

The following month he topped the poll at the November 1982 general election. Fianna Fáil were out of government again, and Barrett was appointed to the front bench as spokesperson on Defence. He remained there until 1984, when he won a seat in the Munster constituency at the European Parliament election and was replaced on the front bench by Noel Treacy. He did not contest either the 1987 general election or the 1989 European Parliament election, and retired from politics. He died on 8 May 2002.

Political offices
Preceded by James Tully	Minister for the Environment; 1977–1980	Succeeded by Ray Burke
Preceded by Pádraig Faulkner	Minister for Defence; 1980–1981	Succeeded by James Tully
Preceded by Joseph Bermingham	Minister of State at the Department of Finance; Mar. 1982–Dec. 1982	Succeeded by Joseph Bermingham

Dáil	Election	Deputy (Party)	Deputy (Party)	Deputy (Party)	Deputy (Party)	Deputy (Party)
2nd	1921	Éamon de Valera (SF)	Brian O'Higgins (SF)	Seán Liddy (SF)	Patrick Brennan (SF)	4 seats 1921–1923
3rd	1922	Éamon de Valera (AT-SF)	Brian O'Higgins (AT-SF)	Seán Liddy (PT-SF)	Patrick Brennan (PT-SF)	4 seats 1921–1923
4th	1923	Éamon de Valera (Rep)	Brian O'Higgins (Rep)	Conor Hogan (FP)	Patrick Hogan (Lab)	Eoin MacNeill (CnaG)
5th	1927 (Jun)	Éamon de Valera (FF)	Patrick Houlihan (FF)	Thomas Falvey (FP)	Patrick Hogan (Lab)	Patrick Kelly (CnaG)
6th	1927 (Sep)	Éamon de Valera (FF)	Patrick Houlihan (FF)	Martin Sexton (FF)	Patrick Hogan (Lab)	Patrick Kelly (CnaG)
7th	1932	Éamon de Valera (FF)	Seán O'Grady (FF)	Martin Sexton (FF)	Patrick Hogan (Lab)	Patrick Burke (CnaG)
8th	1933	Éamon de Valera (FF)	Seán O'Grady (FF)	Patrick Houlihan (FF)	Patrick Hogan (Lab)	Patrick Burke (CnaG)
9th	1937	Éamon de Valera (FF)	Seán O'Grady (FF)	Thomas Burke (FP)	Patrick Hogan (Lab)	Patrick Burke (FG)
10th	1938	Éamon de Valera (FF)	Seán O'Grady (FF)	Thomas Burke (FP)	Peter O'Loghlen (FF)	Patrick Burke (FG)
11th	1943	Éamon de Valera (FF)	Seán O'Grady (FF)	Thomas Burke (FP)	Patrick Hogan (Lab)	Patrick Burke (FG)
12th	1944	Éamon de Valera (FF)	Seán O'Grady (FF)	Thomas Burke (FP)	Peter O'Loghlen (FF)	Patrick Burke (FG)
12th	1945 by-election	Éamon de Valera (FF)	Seán O'Grady (FF)	Thomas Burke (FP)	Peter O'Loghlen (FF)	Patrick Shanahan (FF)
13th	1948	Éamon de Valera (FF)	Seán O'Grady (FF)	Thomas Burke (FP)	Patrick Hogan (Lab)	4 seats 1948–1969
14th	1951	Éamon de Valera (FF)	Patrick Hillery (FF)	William Murphy (FG)	Patrick Hogan (Lab)	4 seats 1948–1969
15th	1954	Éamon de Valera (FF)	Patrick Hillery (FF)	William Murphy (FG)	Patrick Hogan (Lab)	4 seats 1948–1969
16th	1957	Éamon de Valera (FF)	Patrick Hillery (FF)	William Murphy (FG)	Patrick Hogan (Lab)	4 seats 1948–1969
16th	1959 by-election	Seán Ó Ceallaigh (FF)	Patrick Hillery (FF)	William Murphy (FG)	Patrick Hogan (Lab)	4 seats 1948–1969
17th	1961	Seán Ó Ceallaigh (FF)	Patrick Hillery (FF)	William Murphy (FG)	Patrick Hogan (Lab)	4 seats 1948–1969
18th	1965	Seán Ó Ceallaigh (FF)	Patrick Hillery (FF)	William Murphy (FG)	Patrick Hogan (Lab)	4 seats 1948–1969
18th	1968 by-election	Seán Ó Ceallaigh (FF)	Patrick Hillery (FF)	Sylvester Barrett (FF)	Patrick Hogan (Lab)	4 seats 1948–1969
19th	1969	Frank Taylor (FG)	Patrick Hillery (FF)	Sylvester Barrett (FF)	3 seats 1969–1981	
20th	1973	Frank Taylor (FG)	Brendan Daly (FF)	Sylvester Barrett (FF)	3 seats 1969–1981	
21st	1977	Frank Taylor (FG)	Brendan Daly (FF)	Sylvester Barrett (FF)	3 seats 1969–1981	
22nd	1981	Madeleine Taylor (FG)	Brendan Daly (FF)	Sylvester Barrett (FF)	Bill Loughnane (FF)	4 seats since 1981
23rd	1982 (Feb)	Donal Carey (FG)	Brendan Daly (FF)	Sylvester Barrett (FF)	Bill Loughnane (FF)	4 seats since 1981
24th	1982 (Nov)	Donal Carey (FG)	Brendan Daly (FF)	Sylvester Barrett (FF)	Madeleine Taylor-Quinn (FG)	4 seats since 1981
25th	1987	Donal Carey (FG)	Brendan Daly (FF)	Síle de Valera (FF)	Madeleine Taylor-Quinn (FG)	4 seats since 1981
26th	1989	Donal Carey (FG)	Brendan Daly (FF)	Síle de Valera (FF)	Madeleine Taylor-Quinn (FG)	4 seats since 1981
27th	1992	Donal Carey (FG)	Moosajee Bhamjee (Lab)	Síle de Valera (FF)	Tony Killeen (FF)	4 seats since 1981
28th	1997	Donal Carey (FG)	Brendan Daly (FF)	Síle de Valera (FF)	Tony Killeen (FF)	4 seats since 1981
29th	2002	Pat Breen (FG)	James Breen (Ind.)	Síle de Valera (FF)	Tony Killeen (FF)	4 seats since 1981
30th	2007	Pat Breen (FG)	Joe Carey (FG)	Timmy Dooley (FF)	Tony Killeen (FF)	4 seats since 1981
31st	2011	Pat Breen (FG)	Joe Carey (FG)	Timmy Dooley (FF)	Michael McNamara (Lab)	4 seats since 1981
32nd	2016	Pat Breen (FG)	Joe Carey (FG)	Timmy Dooley (FF)	Michael Harty (Ind.)	4 seats since 1981
33rd	2020	Violet-Anne Wynne (SF)	Joe Carey (FG)	Cathal Crowe (FF)	Michael McNamara (Ind.)	4 seats since 1981
34th	2024	Donna McGettigan (SF)	Joe Cooney (FG)	Cathal Crowe (FF)	Timmy Dooley (FF)	4 seats since 1981
