= 25th Dáil =

TDs from 1987 to 1989

←	24th Dáil	26th Dáil	→

Overview
- Legislative body: Dáil Éireann
- Jurisdiction: Ireland
- Meeting place: Leinster House
- Term: 10 March 1987 – 25 May 1989
- Election: 1987 general election
- Government: 20th government of Ireland
- Members: 166
- Ceann Comhairle: Seán Treacy
- Taoiseach: Charles Haughey
- Tánaiste: Brian Lenihan
- Chief Whip: Vincent Brady
- Leader of the Opposition: Alan Dukes

Sessions
- 1st: 10 March 1987 – 26 June 1987
- 2nd: 14 October 1987 – 30 June 1988
- 3rd: 19 October 1988 – 25 May 1989

The 25th Dáil was elected at the 1987 general election on 17 February 1987 and met on 10 March 1987. The members of Dáil Éireann, the house of representatives of the Oireachtas (legislature), of Ireland are known as TDs. It sat with the 18th Seanad as the two Houses of the Oireachtas.

The 25th Dáil was dissolved by President Patrick Hillery on 25 May 1989, at the request of the Taoiseach Charles Haughey. The 25th Dáil lasted 2 years, 76 days. There were no by-elections during the 25th Dáil.

== Composition of the 25th Dáil ==
- 20th government

Party	Feb. 1987	May 1989	Change
Fianna Fáil	81	80	▼1
Fine Gael	51	50	▼1
Progressive Democrats	14	14	Steady
Labour	12	11	▼1
Workers' Party	4	4	Steady
Democratic Socialist	1	1	Steady
Independent Fianna Fáil	1	1	Steady
Independent	2	2	Steady
Ceann Comhairle	—N/a	1	▲1
Vacant	—N/a	2	▲2
Total	166		

Fianna Fáil formed the 20th government of Ireland.

=== Graphical representation ===
This is a graphical comparison of party strengths in the 25th Dáil from March 1987. This was not the official seating plan.

== Ceann Comhairle ==
On 10 March 1987, Seán Treacy (Ind) was proposed by Charles Haughey and seconded by Brian Lenihan for the position of Ceann Comhairle. He was approved without a vote.

== TDs by constituency ==
The list of the 166 TDs elected is given in alphabetical order by Dáil constituency.

Members of the 25th Dáil
Constituency	Name	Party
Carlow–Kilkenny	Liam Aylward	Fianna Fáil
Carlow–Kilkenny	Kieran Crotty	Fine Gael
Carlow–Kilkenny	Martin Gibbons	Progressive Democrats
Carlow–Kilkenny	M. J. Nolan	Fianna Fáil
Carlow–Kilkenny	Séamus Pattison	Labour
Cavan–Monaghan	Andrew Boylan	Fine Gael
Cavan–Monaghan	Tom Fitzpatrick	Fine Gael
Cavan–Monaghan	Jimmy Leonard	Fianna Fáil
Cavan–Monaghan	Rory O'Hanlon	Fianna Fáil
Cavan–Monaghan	John Wilson	Fianna Fáil
Clare	Donal Carey	Fine Gael
Clare	Brendan Daly	Fianna Fáil
Clare	Síle de Valera	Fianna Fáil
Clare	Madeleine Taylor-Quinn	Fine Gael
Cork East	Michael Ahern	Fianna Fáil
Cork East	Patrick Hegarty	Fine Gael
Cork East	Ned O'Keeffe	Fianna Fáil
Cork East	Joe Sherlock	Workers' Party
Cork North-Central	Bernard Allen	Fine Gael
Cork North-Central	Liam Burke	Fine Gael
Cork North-Central	Denis Lyons	Fianna Fáil
Cork North-Central	Máirín Quill	Progressive Democrats
Cork North-Central	Dan Wallace	Fianna Fáil
Cork North-West	Donal Creed	Fine Gael
Cork North-West	Frank Crowley	Fine Gael
Cork North-West	Donal Moynihan	Fianna Fáil
Cork South-Central	Peter Barry	Fine Gael
Cork South-Central	John Dennehy	Fianna Fáil
Cork South-Central	Batt O'Keeffe	Fianna Fáil
Cork South-Central	Toddy O'Sullivan	Labour
Cork South-Central	Pearse Wyse	Progressive Democrats
Cork South-West	Jim O'Keeffe	Fine Gael
Cork South-West	P. J. Sheehan	Fine Gael
Cork South-West	Joe Walsh	Fianna Fáil
Donegal North-East	Neil Blaney	Independent Fianna Fáil
Donegal North-East	Hugh Conaghan	Fianna Fáil
Donegal North-East	Paddy Harte	Fine Gael
Donegal South-West	Mary Coughlan	Fianna Fáil
Donegal South-West	Pat "the Cope" Gallagher	Fianna Fáil
Donegal South-West	Dinny McGinley	Fine Gael
Dublin Central	Bertie Ahern	Fianna Fáil
Dublin Central	Dermot Fitzpatrick	Fianna Fáil
Dublin Central	Tony Gregory	Independent
Dublin Central	Michael Keating	Progressive Democrats
Dublin Central	John Stafford	Fianna Fáil
Dublin North	Ray Burke	Fianna Fáil
Dublin North	John Boland	Fine Gael
Dublin North	G. V. Wright	Fianna Fáil
Dublin North-Central	Vincent Brady	Fianna Fáil
Dublin North-Central	Richard Bruton	Fine Gael
Dublin North-Central	George Birmingham	Fine Gael
Dublin North-Central	Charles Haughey	Fianna Fáil
Dublin North-East	Michael Joe Cosgrave	Fine Gael
Dublin North-East	Liam Fitzgerald	Fianna Fáil
Dublin North-East	Pat McCartan	Workers' Party
Dublin North-East	Michael Woods	Fianna Fáil
Dublin North-West	Michael Barrett	Fianna Fáil
Dublin North-West	Proinsias De Rossa	Workers' Party
Dublin North-West	Mary Flaherty	Fine Gael
Dublin North-West	Jim Tunney	Fianna Fáil
Dublin South	Séamus Brennan	Fianna Fáil
Dublin South	Anne Colley	Progressive Democrats
Dublin South	John Kelly	Fine Gael
Dublin South	Tom Kitt	Fianna Fáil
Dublin South	Alan Shatter	Fine Gael
Dublin South-Central	Ben Briscoe	Fianna Fáil
Dublin South-Central	Frank Cluskey	Labour
Dublin South-Central	Gay Mitchell	Fine Gael
Dublin South-Central	Mary Mooney	Fianna Fáil
Dublin South-Central	Fergus O'Brien	Fine Gael
Dublin South-East	Gerard Brady	Fianna Fáil
Dublin South-East	Garret FitzGerald	Fine Gael
Dublin South-East	Michael McDowell	Progressive Democrats
Dublin South-East	Ruairi Quinn	Labour
Dublin South-West	Chris Flood	Fianna Fáil
Dublin South-West	Mary Harney	Progressive Democrats
Dublin South-West	Mervyn Taylor	Labour
Dublin South-West	Seán Walsh	Fianna Fáil
Dublin West	Liam Lawlor	Fianna Fáil
Dublin West	Brian Lenihan	Fianna Fáil
Dublin West	Tomás Mac Giolla	Workers' Party
Dublin West	Jim Mitchell	Fine Gael
Dublin West	Patrick O'Malley	Progressive Democrats
Dún Laoghaire	David Andrews	Fianna Fáil
Dún Laoghaire	Monica Barnes	Fine Gael
Dún Laoghaire	Seán Barrett	Fine Gael
Dún Laoghaire	Barry Desmond	Labour
Dún Laoghaire	Geraldine Kennedy	Progressive Democrats
Galway East	Paul Connaughton Snr	Fine Gael
Galway East	Michael P. Kitt	Fianna Fáil
Galway East	Noel Treacy	Fianna Fáil
Galway West	John Donnellan	Fine Gael
Galway West	Frank Fahey	Fianna Fáil
Galway West	Máire Geoghegan-Quinn	Fianna Fáil
Galway West	Michael D. Higgins	Labour
Galway West	Bobby Molloy	Progressive Democrats
Kerry North	Jimmy Deenihan	Fine Gael
Kerry North	Denis Foley	Fianna Fáil
Kerry North	Dick Spring	Labour
Kerry South	Michael Begley	Fine Gael
Kerry South	John O'Donoghue	Fianna Fáil
Kerry South	John O'Leary	Fianna Fáil
Kildare	Alan Dukes	Fine Gael
Kildare	Bernard Durkan	Fine Gael
Kildare	Charlie McCreevy	Fianna Fáil
Kildare	Paddy Power	Fianna Fáil
Kildare	Emmet Stagg	Labour
Laois–Offaly	Ger Connolly	Fianna Fáil
Laois–Offaly	Brian Cowen	Fianna Fáil
Laois–Offaly	Tom Enright	Fine Gael
Laois–Offaly	Charles Flanagan	Fine Gael
Laois–Offaly	Liam Hyland	Fianna Fáil
Limerick East	Peadar Clohessy	Progressive Democrats
Limerick East	Jim Kemmy	Democratic Socialist
Limerick East	Michael Noonan	Fine Gael
Limerick East	Willie O'Dea	Fianna Fáil
Limerick East	Desmond O'Malley	Progressive Democrats
Limerick West	Gerry Collins	Fianna Fáil
Limerick West	John McCoy	Progressive Democrats
Limerick West	Michael J. Noonan	Fianna Fáil
Longford–Westmeath	Henry Abbott	Fianna Fáil
Longford–Westmeath	Patrick Cooney	Fine Gael
Longford–Westmeath	Mary O'Rourke	Fianna Fáil
Longford–Westmeath	Albert Reynolds	Fianna Fáil
Louth	Dermot Ahern	Fianna Fáil
Louth	Michael Bell	Labour
Louth	Séamus Kirk	Fianna Fáil
Louth	Brendan McGahon	Fine Gael
Mayo East	Seán Calleary	Fianna Fáil
Mayo East	Jim Higgins	Fine Gael
Mayo East	P. J. Morley	Fianna Fáil
Mayo West	Pádraig Flynn	Fianna Fáil
Mayo West	Denis Gallagher	Fianna Fáil
Mayo West	Enda Kenny	Fine Gael
Meath	John Bruton	Fine Gael
Meath	Noel Dempsey	Fianna Fáil
Meath	John Farrelly	Fine Gael
Meath	Colm Hilliard	Fianna Fáil
Meath	Michael Lynch	Fianna Fáil
Roscommon	Seán Doherty	Fianna Fáil
Roscommon	Terry Leyden	Fianna Fáil
Roscommon	Liam Naughten	Fine Gael
Sligo–Leitrim	Matt Brennan	Fianna Fáil
Sligo–Leitrim	John Ellis	Fianna Fáil
Sligo–Leitrim	Ray MacSharry	Fianna Fáil
Sligo–Leitrim	Ted Nealon	Fine Gael
Tipperary North	Michael Lowry	Fine Gael
Tipperary North	Michael O'Kennedy	Fianna Fáil
Tipperary North	Michael Smith	Fianna Fáil
Tipperary South	Noel Davern	Fianna Fáil
Tipperary South	Brendan Griffin	Fine Gael
Tipperary South	Seán McCarthy	Fianna Fáil
Tipperary South	Seán Treacy	Independent
Waterford	Martin Cullen	Progressive Democrats
Waterford	Austin Deasy	Fine Gael
Waterford	Jackie Fahey	Fianna Fáil
Waterford	Brian Swift	Fianna Fáil
Wexford	John Browne	Fianna Fáil
Wexford	Hugh Byrne	Fianna Fáil
Wexford	Avril Doyle	Fine Gael
Wexford	Brendan Howlin	Labour
Wexford	Ivan Yates	Fine Gael
Wicklow	Gemma Hussey	Fine Gael
Wicklow	Joe Jacob	Fianna Fáil
Wicklow	Liam Kavanagh	Labour
Wicklow	Dick Roche	Fianna Fáil

== Changes ==
Date	Constituency	Loss	Gain	Note
10 March 1987	Tipperary South	Independent	Ceann Comhairle	Seán Treacy (Ind) takes office as Ceann Comhairle
20 April 1988	Galway West	Fine Gael	Independent	John Donnellan (FG) expelled from the parliamentary party
25 January 1989	Sligo–Leitrim	Fianna Fáil		Ray MacSharry nominated as EC Commissioner
7 May 1989	Dublin South-Central	Labour		Death of Frank Cluskey
