= Michael J. Noonan (Fianna Fáil politician) =

Irish politician (1935–2013)

Minister for Defence
- In office 10 March 1987 – 12 July 1989
- Taoiseach: Charles Haughey
- Preceded by: Paddy O'Toole
- Succeeded by: Brian Lenihan Snr

Minister of State
- 1989–1992: Marine

Teachta Dála
- In office June 1969 – June 1997
- Constituency: Limerick West

Personal details
- Born: 4 August 1935 Meanus, County Limerick, Ireland
- Died: 17 September 2013 (aged 78) County Limerick, Ireland
- Party: Fianna Fáil
- Spouse: Helen Sheahan (m. 1961)
- Children: 6
- Education: University College Cork

Michael Joseph Noonan (4 August 1935 – 17 September 2013) was an Irish Fianna Fáil politician. He served as Minister for Defence from 1987 until 1989.

Michael J. Noonan was born in Meanus, County Limerick in 1935. He was educated locally at Salesian College in Limerick before graduating from University College Cork with a Diploma in Rural Science. Following his education, Noonan worked as a farmer before becoming involved in politics. He first entered local politics when he was elected to Limerick County Council in 1967, and remained a member of that council until 1991. He was elected to Dáil Éireann on his first attempt as a Fianna Fáil TD for the Limerick West constituency at the 1969 general election.

Noonan supported Charles Haughey in his successful bid at the 1979 Fianna Fáil leadership election. He owned a 100-acre dairy farm in Crean, where Haughey formally opened an extension to the milking parlour in 1980. In 1983, he was appointed as spokesperson on Agriculture.

Noonan was appointed Minister for Defence in 1987. He caused some controversy in this role, and got into conflict with the Irish Army over the issue of pay. After the 1989 general election Fianna Fáil went into coalition with the Progressive Democrats, and Noonan was the major casualty to accommodate the new ministers. He was appointed Minister of State at the Department of the Marine and remained in this office until February 1992, when Albert Reynolds became Taoiseach, and Noonan was not re-appointed.

He remained a controversial figure on the backbenches. He lost the Fianna Fáil whip twice during the 27th Dáil. In March 1993, he lost the whip after suggesting that Taoiseach Albert Reynolds was not fit to lead the party because he was open to altering Articles 2 and 3 of the Constitution of Ireland which laid a claim to Northern Ireland as part of the national territory; he was re-admitted to the parliamentary party in January 1995, after Bertie Ahern had succeeded as party leader and the party had gone into opposition. He lost the whip a second time in October 1995 by abstaining in vote the divorce referendum bill in the Dáil. In a statement released after his expulsion he attacked Ahern, accusing him of "destroying" Fianna Fáil and described his leadership as a "dictatorship". He was readmitted to the parliamentary party in May 1997, just before the dissolution of the 27th Dáil. He retired from political life at the 1997 general election.

He died on 17 September 2013.

Political offices
Preceded by Paddy O'Toole	Minister for Defence; 1987–1989	Succeeded by Brian Lenihan
Preceded by Pat "the Cope" Gallagher	Minister of State at the Department of the Marine; 1989–1992	Succeeded by Pat "the Cope" Gallagher

Dáil	Election	Deputy (Party)	Deputy (Party)	Deputy (Party)
13th	1948	James Collins (FF)	Donnchadh Ó Briain (FF)	David Madden (FG)
14th	1951	James Collins (FF)	Donnchadh Ó Briain (FF)	David Madden (FG)
15th	1954	James Collins (FF)	Donnchadh Ó Briain (FF)	David Madden (FG)
15th	1955 by-election	James Collins (FF)	Donnchadh Ó Briain (FF)	Michael Colbert (FF)
16th	1957	James Collins (FF)	Donnchadh Ó Briain (FF)	Denis Jones (FG)
17th	1961	James Collins (FF)	Donnchadh Ó Briain (FF)	Denis Jones (FG)
18th	1965	James Collins (FF)	Donnchadh Ó Briain (FF)	Denis Jones (FG)
18th	1967 by-election	Gerry Collins (FF)	Donnchadh Ó Briain (FF)	Denis Jones (FG)
19th	1969	Gerry Collins (FF)	Michael J. Noonan (FF)	Denis Jones (FG)
20th	1973	Gerry Collins (FF)	Michael J. Noonan (FF)	Denis Jones (FG)
21st	1977	Gerry Collins (FF)	Michael J. Noonan (FF)	William O'Brien (FG)
22nd	1981	Gerry Collins (FF)	Michael J. Noonan (FF)	William O'Brien (FG)
23rd	1982 (Feb)	Gerry Collins (FF)	Michael J. Noonan (FF)	William O'Brien (FG)
24th	1982 (Nov)	Gerry Collins (FF)	Michael J. Noonan (FF)	William O'Brien (FG)
25th	1987	Gerry Collins (FF)	Michael J. Noonan (FF)	John McCoy (PDs)
26th	1989	Gerry Collins (FF)	Michael J. Noonan (FF)	Michael Finucane (FG)
27th	1992	Gerry Collins (FF)	Michael J. Noonan (FF)	Michael Finucane (FG)
28th	1997	Michael Collins (FF)	Dan Neville (FG)	Michael Finucane (FG)
29th	2002	Michael Collins (FF)	Dan Neville (FG)	John Cregan (FF)
30th	2007	Niall Collins (FF)	Dan Neville (FG)	John Cregan (FF)
31st	2011	Constituency abolished. See Limerick and Kerry North–West Limerick		
