= John McCoy (Irish politician) =

Irish former politician (born 1940)

Teachta Dála
- In office February 1987 – June 1989
- Constituency: Limerick West

Personal details
- Born: 1 July 1940 (age 85) County Limerick, Ireland
- Party: Progressive Democrats

John McCoy (born 1 July 1940) is an Irish former Progressive Democrats politician. He was elected to Dáil Éireann for the Limerick West constituency at the 1987 general election, along with 13 other Progressive Democrats Teachtaí Dála (TDs) to the 25th Dáil. He did not stand at the 1989 general election.

Dáil	Election	Deputy (Party)	Deputy (Party)	Deputy (Party)
13th	1948	James Collins (FF)	Donnchadh Ó Briain (FF)	David Madden (FG)
14th	1951	James Collins (FF)	Donnchadh Ó Briain (FF)	David Madden (FG)
15th	1954	James Collins (FF)	Donnchadh Ó Briain (FF)	David Madden (FG)
15th	1955 by-election	James Collins (FF)	Donnchadh Ó Briain (FF)	Michael Colbert (FF)
16th	1957	James Collins (FF)	Donnchadh Ó Briain (FF)	Denis Jones (FG)
17th	1961	James Collins (FF)	Donnchadh Ó Briain (FF)	Denis Jones (FG)
18th	1965	James Collins (FF)	Donnchadh Ó Briain (FF)	Denis Jones (FG)
18th	1967 by-election	Gerry Collins (FF)	Donnchadh Ó Briain (FF)	Denis Jones (FG)
19th	1969	Gerry Collins (FF)	Michael J. Noonan (FF)	Denis Jones (FG)
20th	1973	Gerry Collins (FF)	Michael J. Noonan (FF)	Denis Jones (FG)
21st	1977	Gerry Collins (FF)	Michael J. Noonan (FF)	William O'Brien (FG)
22nd	1981	Gerry Collins (FF)	Michael J. Noonan (FF)	William O'Brien (FG)
23rd	1982 (Feb)	Gerry Collins (FF)	Michael J. Noonan (FF)	William O'Brien (FG)
24th	1982 (Nov)	Gerry Collins (FF)	Michael J. Noonan (FF)	William O'Brien (FG)
25th	1987	Gerry Collins (FF)	Michael J. Noonan (FF)	John McCoy (PDs)
26th	1989	Gerry Collins (FF)	Michael J. Noonan (FF)	Michael Finucane (FG)
27th	1992	Gerry Collins (FF)	Michael J. Noonan (FF)	Michael Finucane (FG)
28th	1997	Michael Collins (FF)	Dan Neville (FG)	Michael Finucane (FG)
29th	2002	Michael Collins (FF)	Dan Neville (FG)	John Cregan (FF)
30th	2007	Niall Collins (FF)	Dan Neville (FG)	John Cregan (FF)
31st	2011	Constituency abolished. See Limerick and Kerry North–West Limerick		
