= 1955 Limerick West by-election =

By-election to the 15th Dáil

- 13 December 1955
- Turnout: 26,843 (80.7%)
	Colbert	Jones	Aherne
Nominee	Michael Colbert	Denis Jones	Patrick Aherne
Party	Fianna Fáil	Fine Gael	Labour
First preferences	15,088	9,406	2,349
Percentage	56.2%	35.0%	8.8%
TD before election
David Madden
Fine Gael
TD after election
Michael Colbert
Fianna Fáil

A Dáil by-election was held in the constituency of Limerick West in Ireland on Tuesday, 13 December 1955, to fill a vacancy in the 15th Dáil. It followed the death of Fine Gael Teachta Dála (TD) David Madden on 31 July 1955.

The writ of election to fill the vacancy was agreed by the Dáil on 23 November 1955. The by-election was won by the Fianna Fáil candidate Michael Colbert.

== Result ==
1955 Limerick West by-election
Party	Candidate	FPv%	Count
Party	Candidate	FPv%	1
Fianna Fáil	Michael Colbert	56.2	15,088
Fine Gael	Denis Jones	35.0	9,406
Labour	Patrick Aherne	8.8	2,349
Electorate: 33,267 Valid: 26,843 Quota: 13,422 Turnout: 80.7%
