= Limerick West (Dáil constituency) =

Dáil constituency (1948–2011)

- Former Dáil constituency
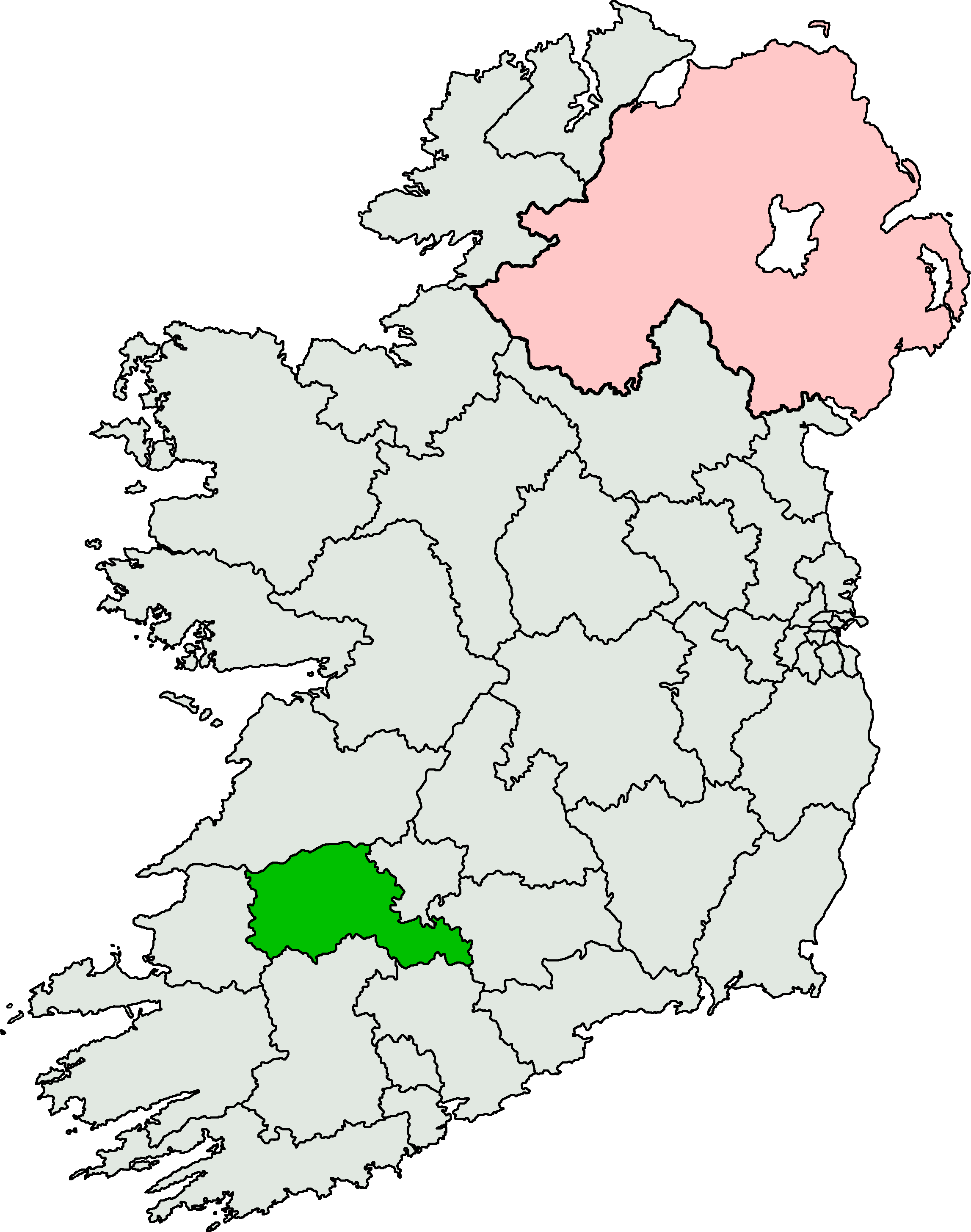
- Location of Limerick West within Ireland

Former constituency
- Created: 1948
- Abolished: 2011
- Seats: 3
- Local government area: County Limerick
- Created from: Limerick
- Replaced by: Limerick; Kerry North–West Limerick

Limerick West was a parliamentary constituency represented in Dáil Éireann, the lower house of the Irish parliament or Oireachtas from 1948 to 2011. The constituency elected 3 deputies (Teachtaí Dála, commonly known as TDs). The method of election was proportional representation by means of the single transferable vote (PR-STV).

== History and boundaries ==
The constituency was created under the Electoral (Amendment) Act 1947 for the 1948 general election. It succeeded the constituency of Limerick, which was divided between Limerick West and Limerick East. It was located in the western and southern part of County Limerick. It was a rural constituency, including the towns of Abbeyfeale, Askeaton, Newcastle West and Rathkeale.

In some elections, such as in 1981 and 1982, only Fianna Fáil and Fine Gael candidates appeared on the ballot. A Progressive Democrats candidate was elected in 1987; this was the only time a candidate from a party other than Fianna Fáil or Fine Gael was elected in the constituency. No candidate from a left-wing party was ever elected there.

At the 2011 general election the constituency was replaced by the constituencies of Limerick and Kerry North–West Limerick. The western part of the constituency became part of Kerry North–West Limerick, while the remainder, along with most of the rural parts of Limerick East, was transferred to the Limerick constituency.

== TDs ==
Teachtaí Dála (TDs) for Limerick West 1948–2011
Key to parties: FF = Fianna Fáil; FG = Fine Gael; PDs = Progressive Democrats
Dáil	Election	Deputy (Party)	Deputy (Party)	Deputy (Party)
13th	1948	James Collins (FF)	Donnchadh Ó Briain (FF)	David Madden (FG)
14th	1951	James Collins (FF)	Donnchadh Ó Briain (FF)	David Madden (FG)
15th	1954	James Collins (FF)	Donnchadh Ó Briain (FF)	David Madden (FG)
15th	1955 by-election	James Collins (FF)	Donnchadh Ó Briain (FF)	Michael Colbert (FF)
16th	1957	James Collins (FF)	Donnchadh Ó Briain (FF)	Denis Jones (FG)
17th	1961	James Collins (FF)	Donnchadh Ó Briain (FF)	Denis Jones (FG)
18th	1965	James Collins (FF)	Donnchadh Ó Briain (FF)	Denis Jones (FG)
18th	1967 by-election	Gerry Collins (FF)	Donnchadh Ó Briain (FF)	Denis Jones (FG)
19th	1969	Gerry Collins (FF)	Michael J. Noonan (FF)	Denis Jones (FG)
20th	1973	Gerry Collins (FF)	Michael J. Noonan (FF)	Denis Jones (FG)
21st	1977	Gerry Collins (FF)	Michael J. Noonan (FF)	William O'Brien (FG)
22nd	1981	Gerry Collins (FF)	Michael J. Noonan (FF)	William O'Brien (FG)
23rd	1982 (Feb)	Gerry Collins (FF)	Michael J. Noonan (FF)	William O'Brien (FG)
24th	1982 (Nov)	Gerry Collins (FF)	Michael J. Noonan (FF)	William O'Brien (FG)
25th	1987	Gerry Collins (FF)	Michael J. Noonan (FF)	John McCoy (PDs)
26th	1989	Gerry Collins (FF)	Michael J. Noonan (FF)	Michael Finucane (FG)
27th	1992	Gerry Collins (FF)	Michael J. Noonan (FF)	Michael Finucane (FG)
28th	1997	Michael Collins (FF)	Dan Neville (FG)	Michael Finucane (FG)
29th	2002	Michael Collins (FF)	Dan Neville (FG)	John Cregan (FF)
30th	2007	Niall Collins (FF)	Dan Neville (FG)	John Cregan (FF)
31st	2011	Constituency abolished. See Limerick and Kerry North–West Limerick		

Note: The columns in this table are used only for presentational purposes, and no significance should be attached to the order of columns. For details of the order in which seats were won at each election, see the detailed results of that election.

== Elections ==
*: Outgoing TD

=== 2007 general election ===
2007 general election: Limerick West
Party	Candidate	FPv%	Count		
Party	Candidate	FPv%	1	2	3
Fianna Fáil	Niall Collins	25.7	10,396		
Fianna Fáil	John Cregan	21.5	8,701	8,823	10,355
Fine Gael	Dan Neville	20.6	8,314	8,504	10,018
Fine Gael	Michael Finucane	19.4	7,839	7,975	9,027
Labour	James Heffernan	5.6	2,277	2,687	
Progressive Democrats	Michael Brennan	4.8	1,935	1,993	
Green	James Nix	2.4	969		
Electorate: 58,712 Valid: 40,431 Spoilt: 381 (0.9%) Quota: 10,108 Turnout: 40,812 (69.5%)

=== 2002 general election ===
In the final count Dan Neville beat Michael Finucane by only one vote to win the last seat.

2002 general election: Limerick West
Party	Candidate	FPv%	Count			
Party	Candidate	FPv%	1	2	3	4
Fianna Fáil	John Cregan	30.3	10,823			
Fianna Fáil	Michael Collins	23.1	8,236	9,526		
Fine Gael	Dan Neville	20.9	7,446	7,678	7,862	8,564
Fine Gael	Michael Finucane	20.8	7,410	7,684	7,867	8,563
Green	Marcus Briody	2.7	948	1,002	1,138	
Independent	Mike MacDomhnaill	1.9	662	710	789	
Christian Solidarity	Patrick O'Riordan	0.4	144	151	177	
Electorate: 53,879 Valid: 35,669 Spoilt: 476 (1.3%) Quota: 8,918 Turnout: 36,145 (67.1%)

=== 1997 general election ===
1997 general election: Limerick West
Party	Candidate	FPv%	Count						
Party	Candidate	FPv%	1	2	3	4	5	6	7
Fine Gael	Dan Neville	20.9	7,026	7,062	7,265	7,672	8,253	8,601	
Fianna Fáil	Michael Collins	20.8	6,985	7,029	7,357	7,519	8,236	11,692	
Fine Gael	Michael Finucane	16.3	5,476	5,523	5,679	6,170	6,673	6,923	7,330
Fianna Fáil	John Clifford	11.7	3,921	3,953	4,255	4,337	4,937		
Independent	Michael Brennan	10.9	3,661	3,695	3,890	4,067	4,946	5,474	6,583
Independent	John Gallahue	10.0	3,355	3,413	3,521	3,689			
Labour	Mary Kelly	4.2	1,418	1,478	1,584				
Progressive Democrats	Jeanette McDonnell	4.2	1,406	1,444					
Independent	Mike MacDomhnaill	1.1	366						
Electorate: 47,859 Valid: 33,614 Spoilt: 365 (1.1%) Quota: 8,404 Turnout: 33,979 (71.0%)

=== 1992 general election ===
1992 general election: Limerick West
Party	Candidate	FPv%	Count						
Party	Candidate	FPv%	1	2	3	4	5	6	7
Fianna Fáil	Gerry Collins	34.3	10,913						
Fine Gael	Michael Finucane	16.2	5,164	5,420	5,448	5,481	5,584	6,187	7,600
Fine Gael	Dan Neville	14.6	4,657	4,807	4,831	4,842	4,941	5,582	6,631
Fianna Fáil	Michael J. Noonan	13.1	4,173	6,288	6,313	6,417	6,636	7,123	7,990
Labour	Mary Kelly	10.8	3,447	3,668	3,700	3,801	3,892	4,494	
Progressive Democrats	Seán Liston	7.4	2,343	2,476	2,493	2,521	2,589		
Independent	Bridget Randles	2.0	645	682	688	709			
Sinn Féin	Colreall Mac Curtain	1.1	346	365	370				
Independent	John Basil Fitzgibbon	0.4	129	156					
Electorate: 44,848 Valid: 31,817 Spoilt: 524 (1.6%) Quota: 7,955 Turnout: 32,341 (72.1%)

=== 1989 general election ===
1989 general election: Limerick West
Party	Candidate	FPv%	Count	
Party	Candidate	FPv%	1	2
Fianna Fáil	Gerry Collins	39.7	12,476	
Fine Gael	Michael Finucane	27.0	8,484	
Fianna Fáil	Michael J. Noonan	20.7	6,491	9,935
Progressive Democrats	Seán Liston	12.6	3,960	4,467
Electorate: 43,690 Valid: 31,411 Spoilt: 481 (1.5%) Quota: 7,853 Turnout: 31,892 (73.0%)

=== 1987 general election ===
1987 general election: Limerick West
Party	Candidate	FPv%	Count				
Party	Candidate	FPv%	1	2	3	4	5
Fianna Fáil	Gerry Collins	31.8	10,812				
Fianna Fáil	Michael J. Noonan	19.5	6,631	8,504			
Progressive Democrats	John McCoy	19.4	6,580	6,789	6,971	7,748	9,082
Fine Gael	Jim Houlihan	9.9	3,352	3,408	3,457	4,357	
Fine Gael	Michael Finucane	9.5	3,218	3,314	3,439	4,568	7,102
Fine Gael	Dan Neville	8.5	2,894	2,950	3,012		
Labour	Paudge Brennan	1.5	519	539			
Electorate: 43,418 Valid: 34,006 Quota: 8,502 Turnout: 78.3%

=== November 1982 general election ===
November 1982 general election: Limerick West
Party	Candidate	FPv%	Count	
Party	Candidate	FPv%	1	2
Fianna Fáil	Gerry Collins	40.0	12,719	
Fine Gael	William O'Brien	26.5	8,435	
Fianna Fáil	Michael J. Noonan	22.2	7,061	11,478
Fine Gael	Brendan Danaher	11.3	3,580	3,933
Electorate: 41,825 Valid: 31,795 Quota: 7,949 Turnout: 76.0%

=== February 1982 general election ===
February 1982 general election: Limerick West
Party	Candidate	FPv%	Count	
Party	Candidate	FPv%	1	2
Fianna Fáil	Gerry Collins	40.1	12,702	
Fine Gael	William O'Brien	26.5	8,390	
Fianna Fáil	Michael J. Noonan	23.8	7,535	12,056
Fine Gael	Seán Broderick	9.7	3,088	3,340
Electorate: 41,097 Valid: 31,715 Quota: 7,929 Turnout: 77.2%

=== 1981 general election ===
1981 general election: Limerick West
Party	Candidate	FPv%	Count	
Party	Candidate	FPv%	1	2
Fianna Fáil	Gerry Collins	44.5	14,776	
Fine Gael	William O'Brien	26.2	8,676	
Fianna Fáil	Michael J. Noonan	19.8	6,579	12,731
Fine Gael	Donal Sheehan	9.5	3,158	3,484
Electorate: 41,097 Valid: 33,189 Spoilt: 387 (1.2%) Quota: 8,298 Turnout: 33,576 (81.7%)

=== 1977 general election ===
1977 general election: Limerick West
Party	Candidate	FPv%	Count		
Party	Candidate	FPv%	1	2	3
Fianna Fáil	Gerry Collins	30.2	10,081		
Fianna Fáil	Michael J. Noonan	29.2	9,749		
Fine Gael	William O'Brien	22.7	7,596	8,153	8,887
Fine Gael	Ailish Jones-Cassidy	9.5	3,165	3,526	3,775
Labour	Edward Dwyer	4.3	1,444	1,950	2,299
Fine Gael	Seán Broderick	4.1	1,379	1,682	1,745
Electorate: 42,037 Valid: 33,414 Spoilt: 266 (0.8%) Quota: 8,354 Turnout: 33,680 (80.1%)

=== 1973 general election ===
1973 general election: Limerick West
Party	Candidate	FPv%	Count		
Party	Candidate	FPv%	1	2	3
Fianna Fáil	Gerry Collins	33.9	9,679		
Fine Gael	Denis Jones	22.4	6,403	6,555	8,337
Fianna Fáil	Michael J. Noonan	18.9	5,398	7,635	
Fine Gael	William O'Brien	14.9	4,253	4,313	5,165
Fine Gael	Brendan Danaher	9.8	2,792	2,890	
Electorate: 35,904 Valid: 28,525 Quota: 7,132 Turnout: 79.5%

=== 1969 general election ===
1969 general election: Limerick West
Party	Candidate	FPv%	Count							
Party	Candidate	FPv%	1	2	3	4	5	6	7	8
Fianna Fáil	Gerry Collins	36.7	10,557							
Fine Gael	Denis Jones	21.4	6,165	6,340	6,359	6,463	6,894	8,432		
Fine Gael	William O'Brien	10.8	3,102	3,175	3,192	3,237	3,423	3,966	5,110	5,300
Fianna Fáil	Michael J. Noonan	9.0	2,598	3,696	3,765	3,794	3,911	4,042	4,085	7,153
Fine Gael	Brendan Danaher	8.2	2,366	2,459	2,520	2,540	2,674			
Fianna Fáil	Rory Kiely	6.9	1,991	3,686	3,703	3,730	3,865	4,017	4,063	
Labour	Edward Dwyer	4.4	1,254	1,398	1,410	1,732				
Labour	Michael Murphy	1.8	529	589	607					
Independent	Noel Lynch	0.8	231	251						
Electorate: 35,621 Valid: 28,793 Quota: 7,199 Turnout: 80.8%

=== 1967 by-election ===
Following the death of Fianna Fáil TD James Collins, a by-election was held on 9 November 1967. The seat was won by the Fianna Fáil candidate Gerry Collins, son of the deceased TD.

1967 by-election: Limerick West
Party	Candidate	FPv%	Count
Party	Candidate	FPv%	1
Fianna Fáil	Gerry Collins	53.8	14,384
Fine Gael	William Madden	38.6	10,237
Labour	Edward Dwyer	7.7	2,048
Electorate: 32,958 Valid: 26,669 Quota: 13,335 Turnout: 80.9%

=== 1965 general election ===
1965 general election: Limerick West
Party	Candidate	FPv%	Count	
Party	Candidate	FPv%	1	2
Fianna Fáil	James Collins	33.4	8,476	
Fine Gael	Denis Jones	28.5	7,213	
Fianna Fáil	Donnchadh Ó Briain	21.1	5,343	7,160
Labour	Edward Dwyer	9.1	2,304	2,497
Fine Gael	Brendan Danaher	8.0	2,020	2,146
Electorate: 33,009 Valid: 25,356 Quota: 6,340 Turnout: 76.8%

=== 1961 general election ===
1961 general election: Limerick West
Party	Candidate	FPv%	Count	
Party	Candidate	FPv%	1	2
Fianna Fáil	James Collins	35.5	9,018	
Fine Gael	Denis Jones	27.7	7,037	
Fianna Fáil	Donnchadh Ó Briain	23.6	6,006	8,514
Fine Gael	James O'Donnell	13.2	3,346	3,504
Electorate: 33,411 Valid: 25,407 Quota: 6,352 Turnout: 76.0%

=== 1957 general election ===
1957 general election: Limerick West
Party	Candidate	FPv%	Count			
Party	Candidate	FPv%	1	2	3	4
Fine Gael	Denis Jones	30.8	7,952			
Fianna Fáil	James Collins	30.6	7,910			
Fianna Fáil	Donnchadh Ó Briain	19.3	4,985	5,334	6,089	6,232
Fianna Fáil	Michael Colbert	17.3	4,467	5,095	5,748	6,114
Independent	Martin Ward	2.0	514	1,031	1,075	
Electorate: 33,014 Valid: 25,828 Quota: 6,458 Turnout: 78.2%

=== 1955 by-election ===
Following the death of Fine Gael TD David Madden, a by-election was held on 13 December 1955. The seat was won by the Fianna Fáil candidate Michael Colbert.

1955 by-election: Limerick West
Party	Candidate	FPv%	Count
Party	Candidate	FPv%	1
Fianna Fáil	Michael Colbert	56.2	15,088
Fine Gael	Denis Jones	35.0	9,406
Labour	Patrick Aherne	8.8	2,349
Electorate: 33,267 Valid: 26,843 Quota: 13,422 Turnout: 80.7%

=== 1954 general election ===
1954 general election: Limerick West
Party	Candidate	FPv%	Count			
Party	Candidate	FPv%	1	2	3	4
Fianna Fáil	James Collins	28.5	7,857			
Fianna Fáil	Donnchadh Ó Briain	25.6	7,078			
Fine Gael	David Madden	20.3	5,614	6,528	6,724	8,943
Labour	Gerard Hayes	11.8	3,249	3,452	3,981	4,350
Fine Gael	William O'Connor	9.0	2,471	2,629	2,860	
Fine Gael	Liam Bennett	4.8	1,331			
Electorate: 33,318 Valid: 27,600 Quota: 6,901 Turnout: 82.8%

=== 1951 general election ===
1951 general election: Limerick West
Party	Candidate	FPv%	Count		
Party	Candidate	FPv%	1	2	3
Fine Gael	David Madden	29.2	7,901		
Fianna Fáil	James Collins	25.3	6,851		
Fianna Fáil	Donnchadh Ó Briain	22.0	5,966	6,069	9,189
Fianna Fáil	Richard Bresnihan	13.1	3,541	3,578	
Fine Gael	William O'Connor	10.4	2,827	3,816	3,995
Electorate: 35,877 Valid: 27,086 Quota: 6,772 Turnout: 75.5%

=== 1948 general election ===
1948 general election: Limerick West
Party	Candidate	FPv%	Count						
Party	Candidate	FPv%	1	2	3	4	5	6	7
Fianna Fáil	James Collins	24.7	6,778	6,853	6,871				
Fianna Fáil	Donnchadh Ó Briain	22.2	6,101	6,217	6,256	6,452	6,983		
Fine Gael	David Madden	16.8	4,602	4,742	4,854	5,510	5,891	5,906	7,566
Fianna Fáil	John Lynch	8.1	2,235	2,256	2,311	2,399	2,750	2,826	2,882
Fine Gael	Timothy O'Connell	6.5	1,783	1,844	1,908	2,069	2,194	2,207	
Labour	Patrick Langan	6.2	1,695	1,787	1,809	1,964			
Clann na Poblachta	James O'Connor	5.1	1,402	1,445	1,944	2,071	2,386	2,395	2,659
Independent	Patrick Fitzsimons	4.6	1,257	1,439	1,482				
Clann na Poblachta	Patrick Terence Liston	3.0	836	881					
Independent	Michael J. K. Dore	2.9	787						
Electorate: 35,766 Valid: 27,476 Quota: 6,870 Turnout: 76.8%

== See also ==
- Dáil constituencies
- Politics of the Republic of Ireland
- List of political parties in the Republic of Ireland
- List of Dáil by-elections
- Elections in the Republic of Ireland
