= 1987 Irish general election =

Election to the 25th Dáil

- 17 February 1987

166 seats in Dáil Éireann (Note: Including Thomas J. Fitzpatrick (FG), returned automatically for Cavan–Monaghan as outgoing Ceann Comhairle, under Art. 16.6 of the Constitution and the Electoral Act 1963, as amended.) 84 seats needed for a majority
- Turnout: 73.3% ▲0.4 pp
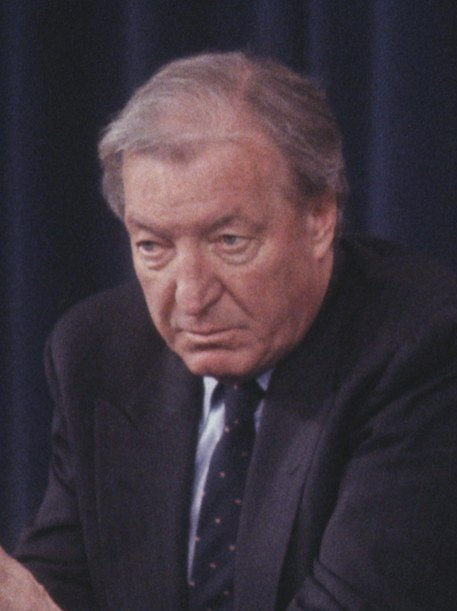

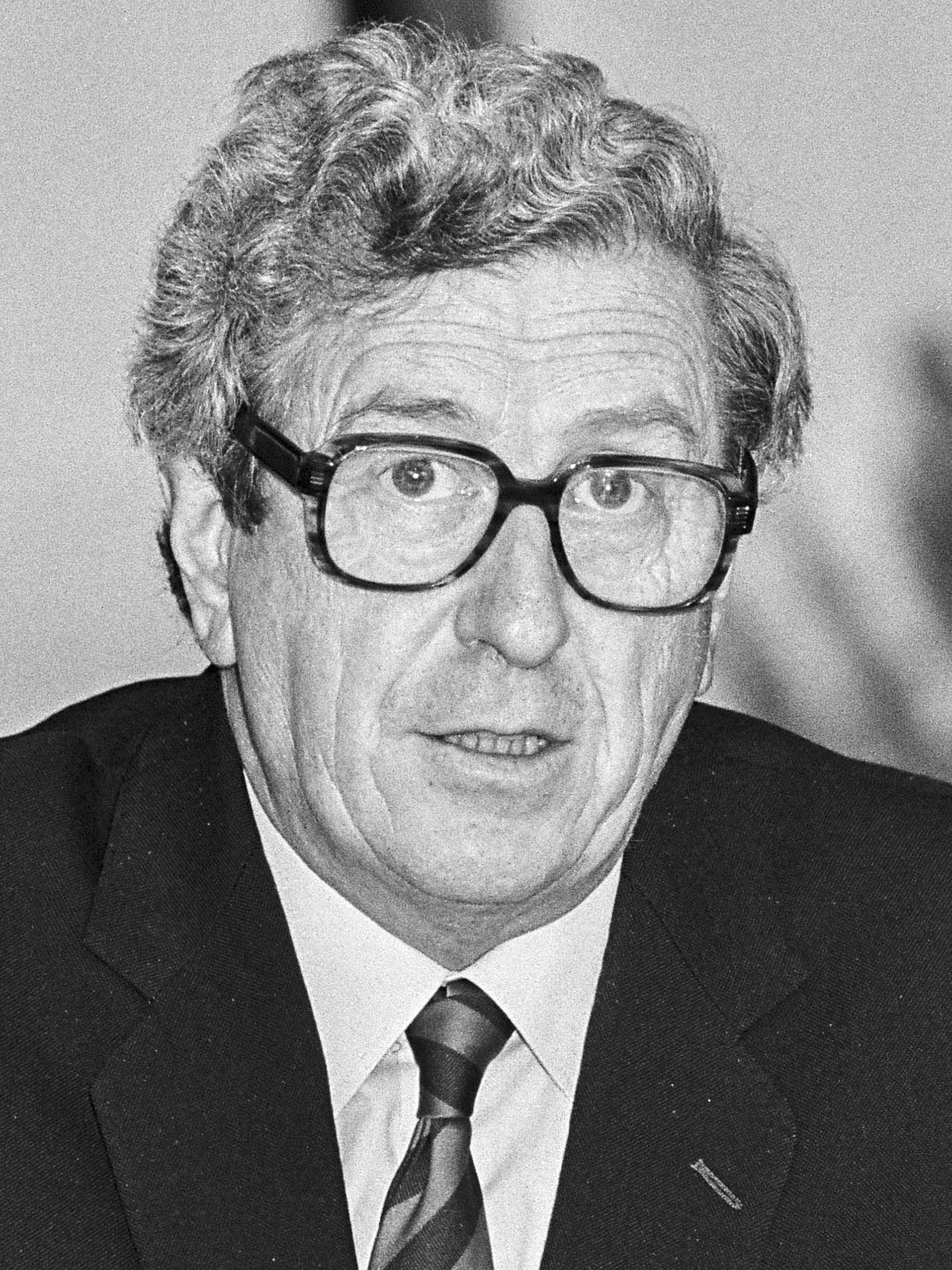

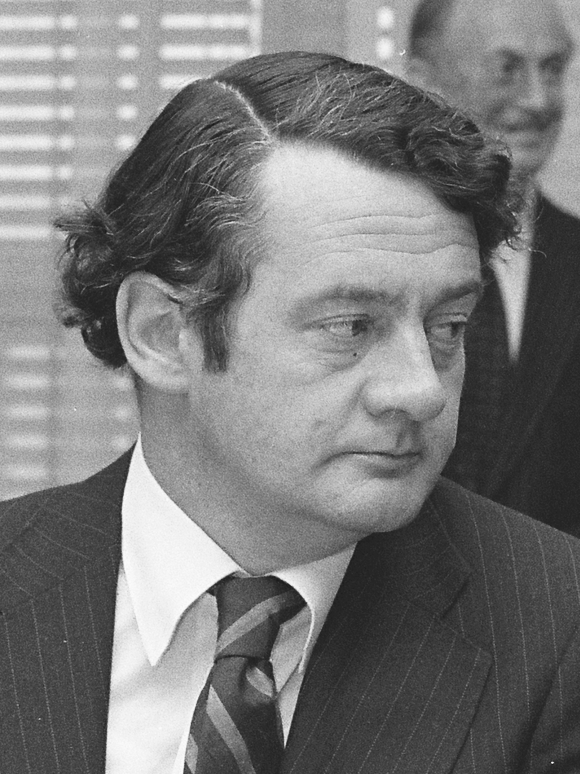

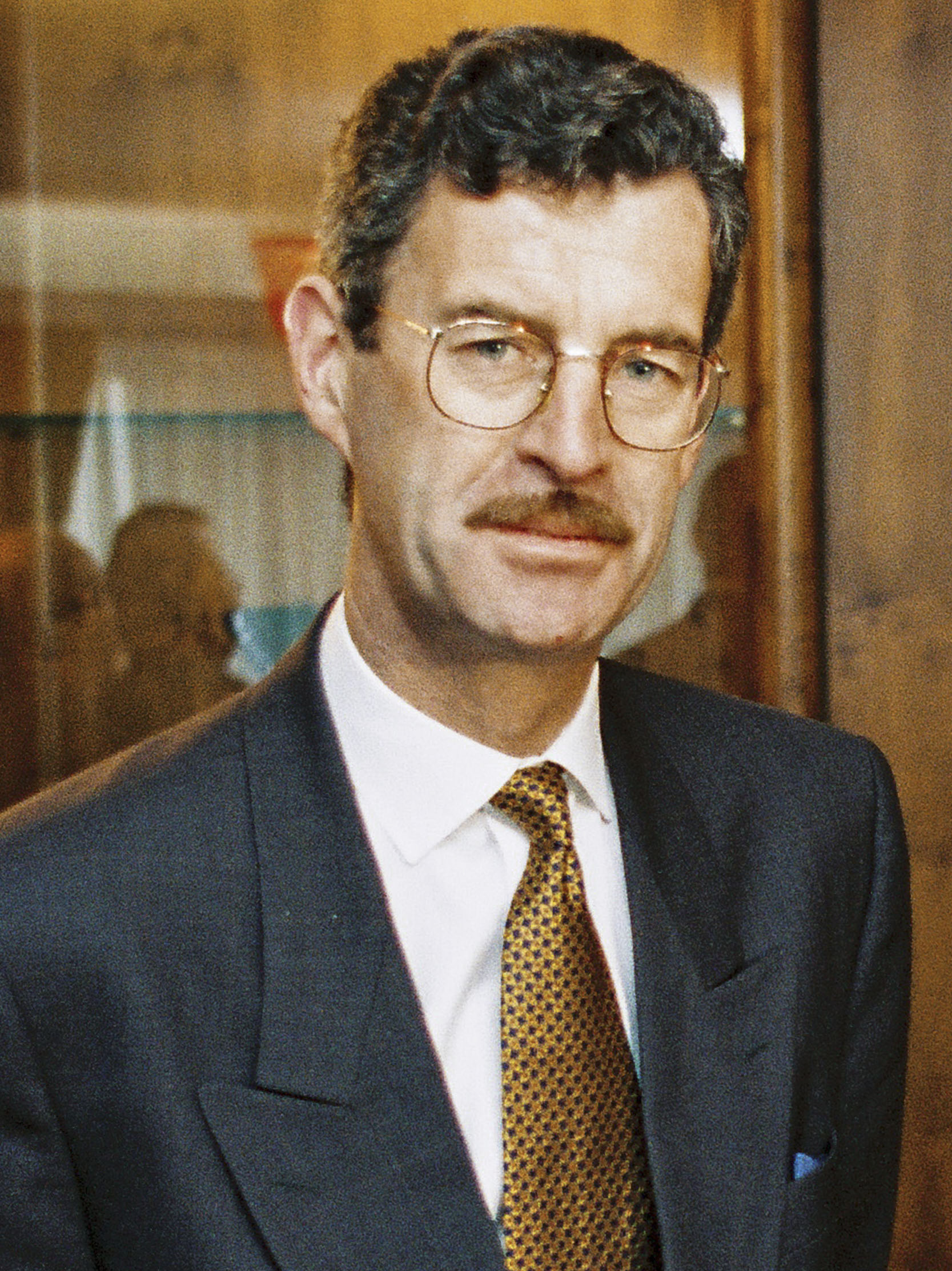

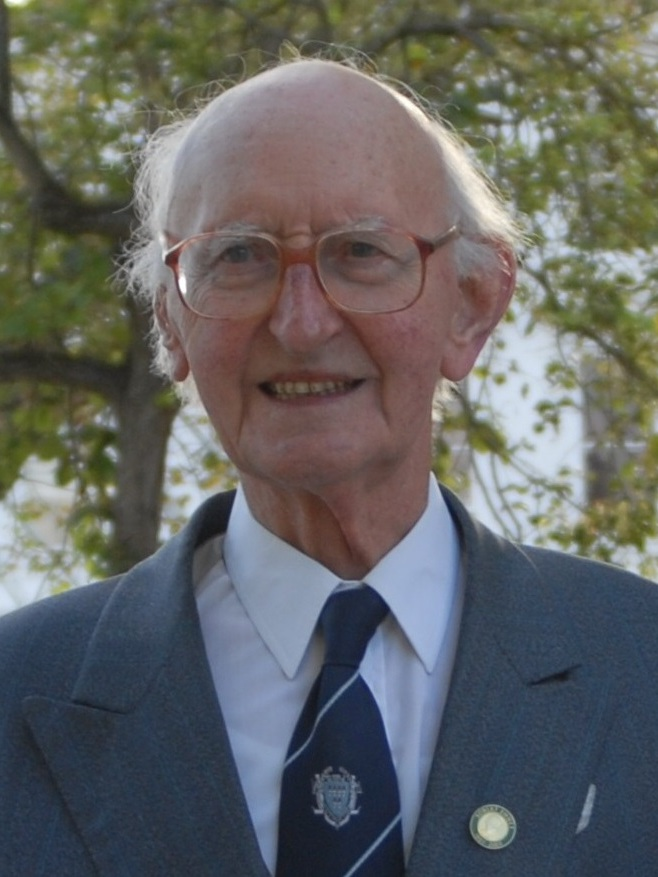
	First party	Second party	Third party
Leader	Charles Haughey	Garret FitzGerald	Desmond O'Malley
Party	Fianna Fáil	Fine Gael	Progressive Democrats
Leader since	7 December 1979	5 July 1977	21 December 1985
Leader's seat	Dublin North-Central	Dublin South-East	Limerick East
Last election	75 seats, 45.2%	70 seats, 39.2%	New party
Seats won	81	51	14
Seat change	▲6	▼19	▲14
Popular vote	784,547	481,127	210,583
Percentage	44.2%	27.1%	11.9%
Swing	▼1.0 pp	▼12.1 pp	New party
	Fourth party	Fifth party	Sixth party
			DSP
Leader	Dick Spring	Tomás Mac Giolla	Jim Kemmy
Party	Labour	Workers' Party	Democratic Socialist
Leader since	1 November 1982	14 October 1977	23 September 1982
Leader's seat	Kerry North	Dublin West	Limerick East
Last election	16 seats, 9.4%	2 seats, 3.3%	0 seats, 0.4%
Seats won	12	4	1
Seat change	▼4	▲2	▲1
Popular vote	114,551	67,293	7,424
Percentage	6.5%	3.8%	0.4%
Swing	▼2.9 pp	▲0.5 pp	Steady
Taoiseach before election
Garret FitzGerald
Fine Gael
Taoiseach after election
Charles Haughey
Fianna Fáil

The 1987 Irish general election to the 25th Dáil was held on Tuesday, 17 February, four weeks after the dissolution of the 24th Dáil on 20 January by President Patrick Hillery, on the request of Taoiseach Garret FitzGerald. A continuing crisis over public finance and a rejection of the budget had led to the Labour Party withdrawing from the Fine Gael–led coalition government. The general election took place in 41 Dáil constituencies throughout Ireland for 166 seats in Dáil Éireann, the house of representatives of the Oireachtas. There were minor amendments to constituency boundaries under the Electoral (Amendment) Act 1983.

The 25th Dáil met at Leinster House on 10 March to nominate the Taoiseach for appointment by the president and to approve the appointment of a new government of Ireland. Charles Haughey was appointed Taoiseach, forming the 20th government of Ireland, a minority single-party Fianna Fáil government.

== Campaign ==
The 1987 general election was precipitated by the withdrawal of the Labour Party from the Fine Gael–led government on 20 January 1987. The reason was a disagreement over budget proposals. Rather than attempt to press on with the government's agenda, the Taoiseach and leader of Fine Gael, Garret FitzGerald, sought a dissolution of the Dáil. An unusually long period of four weeks was set for the campaign.

Fianna Fáil's campaign involved a refusal to make any definite commitments; however, it attempted to convince the electorate that the country would be better under Fianna Fáil. Charles Haughey's attitudes toward Northern Ireland and the Anglo-Irish Agreement were both attacked. However, the campaign was mostly fought on economic issues.

The Labour Party decided against any pre-election pact, particularly with Fine Gael. The Progressive Democrats (PD), founded only two years earlier, surpassed Labour as the third-biggest political party in the Dáil. Although the majority of the PD party consisted of Fianna Fáil defectors, it mainly took seats from Fine Gael.

== Results ==
Election to the 25th Dáil – 17 February 1987
Party	Leader	Seats	±	% of seats	First pref. votes	% FPv	±%
Fianna Fáil	Charles Haughey	81	▲6	48.8	784,547	44.1	▼1.1
Fine Gael	Garret FitzGerald	51	▼19	30.1	481,127	27.1	▼12.1
Progressive Democrats	Desmond O'Malley	14	▲14 (Note: During the previous Dáil, 4 Fianna Fáil TDs and 1 Fine Gael TD had joined the Progressive Democrats.)	8.4	210,583	11.8	–
Labour	Dick Spring	12	▼4	7.2	114,551	6.4	▼3.0
Workers' Party	Tomás Mac Giolla	4	▲2	2.4	67,273	3.8	▲0.5
Sinn Féin	Gerry Adams	0	New	0	32,933	1.9	–
Democratic Socialist	Jim Kemmy	1	▲1	0.6	7,424	0.4	0
Green	None	0	0	0	7,159	0.4	▲0.2
Communist	Eugene McCartan	0	0	0	725	0.0	0
Independent	N/A	3	▼1	1.8	70,843	4.0	▲1.7
Spoilt votes					16,241	—N/a	—N/a
Total		166	0	100	1,793,406	100	—N/a
Electorate/Turnout					2,445,515	73.3%	—N/a

Notes

- Independents include Independent Fianna Fáil (7,720 votes, 1 seat) and the Tax Reform League (3,832 votes).
- Changes in numbers of seats for each party are shown relative to the previous election in November 1982.

Although opinion polls had suggested otherwise, Fianna Fáil once again failed to win an overall majority. The Progressive Democrats did exceptionally well in their first general election, becoming the third-biggest party in the Dáil. Fine Gael lost many seats, mostly to the PDs. The Labour Party fell to its lowest share of the vote since 1933, but managed to salvage 12 seats, more than expected, including that of its leader Dick Spring, who saved his seat by just four votes.

=== Voting summary ===
First preference vote
Fianna Fáil	44.15%
Fine Gael	27.07%
Progressive Democrats	11.85%
Labour	6.45%
Workers'	3.79%
Sinn Féin	1.85%
Others	0.86%
Independent	3.99%

=== Seats summary ===
Dáil seats
Fianna Fáil	48.80%
Fine Gael	30.72%
Progressive Democrats	8.43%
Labour	7.23%
Workers'	2.41%
Democratic Socialist	0.60%
Independent	1.81%

== Government formation ==
Fianna Fáil formed the 20th government of Ireland, a minority government, with Charles Haughey returning as Taoiseach. Haughey was nominated as Taoiseach with the votes of his own party, the support of Independent Fianna Fáil TD Neil Blaney and the abstention of Independent TD Tony Gregory. That left him with just half of votes cast. Ceann Comhairle Seán Treacy exercised his casting vote in favour of the nomination of Haughey. The Fianna Fáil government of 1987 to 1989 was the last time to date that a government composed only of members of one party has been formed in Ireland.

== Dáil membership changes ==
The following changes took place at the election:

- 17 outgoing TDs retired
- 1 vacant seat at election time
- 147 outgoing TDs stood for re-election (also Tom Fitzpatrick, the outgoing Ceann Comhairle, who was automatically returned)
  - 127 of those were re-elected
  - 20 failed to be re-elected
- 38 successor TDs were elected
  - 32 were elected for the first time
  - 6 had previously been TDs
- There were 6 successor female TDs, with the total remaining unchanged at 14
- There were changes in 32 of the 41 constituencies contested

Where more than one change took place in a constituency, the concept of successor is an approximation for presentation only.

Constituency	Departing TD	Party	Change	Comment	Successor TD	Party
Carlow–Kilkenny	Dick Dowling	Fine Gael	Retired		Martin Gibbons	Progressive Democrats
Cavan–Monaghan	John Conlan	Fine Gael	Lost seat		Andrew Boylan	Fine Gael
Clare	Sylvester Barrett	Fianna Fáil	Retired	De Valera – former TD	Síle de Valera	Fianna Fáil
Cork East	Myra Barry	Fine Gael	Retired	Sherlock – former TD	Joe Sherlock	Workers' Party
Cork North-Central	Toddy O'Sullivan	Labour Party	Moved	O'Sullivan moved to Cork South-Central	Máirín Quill	Progressive Democrats
Cork North-West	No membership changes					
Cork South-Central	Gene Fitzgerald	Fianna Fáil	Retired		John Dennehy	Fianna Fáil
Cork South-Central	Hugh Coveney	Fine Gael	Lost seat		Batt O'Keeffe	Fianna Fáil
Cork South-Central	Eileen Desmond	Labour Party	Retired	O'Sullivan moved from Cork North-Central	Toddy O'Sullivan	Labour Party
Cork South-West	No membership changes					
Donegal North-East	No membership changes					
Donegal South-West	Cathal Coughlan	Fianna Fáil	Vacant (Note: Cathal Coughlan died in 1986 but no by-election was held.)		Mary Coughlan	Fianna Fáil
Dublin Central	Tom Leonard	Fianna Fáil	Retired		Dermot Fitzpatrick	Fianna Fáil
Dublin Central	Alice Glenn	Independent	Lost seat	Glenn was elected as an FG TD in 1982	John Stafford	Fianna Fáil
Dublin North	Nora Owen	Fine Gael	Lost seat		G. V. Wright	Fianna Fáil
Dublin North-Central	No membership changes					
Dublin North-East	Maurice Manning	Fine Gael	Lost seat		Pat McCartan	Workers' Party
Dublin North-West	No membership changes					
Dublin South	Nuala Fennell	Fine Gael	Lost seat		Anne Colley	Progressive Democrats
Dublin South	Niall Andrews	Fianna Fáil	Retired		Tom Kitt	Fianna Fáil
Dublin South-Central	John O'Connell	Fianna Fáil	Lost seat		Mary Mooney	Fianna Fáil
Dublin South-East	Joe Doyle	Fine Gael	Lost seat		Michael McDowell	Progressive Democrats
Dublin South-West	Michael O'Leary	Fine Gael	Retired		Chris Flood	Fianna Fáil
Dublin West	Liam Skelly	Fine Gael	Lost seat		Patrick O'Malley	Progressive Democrats
Dublin West	Eileen Lemass	Fianna Fáil	Retired	Lawlor – former TD	Liam Lawlor	Fianna Fáil
Dún Laoghaire	Liam T. Cosgrave	Fine Gael	Lost seat		Geraldine Kennedy	Progressive Democrats
Galway East	No membership changes					
Galway West	Fintan Coogan Jnr	Fine Gael	Lost seat	Higgins – former TD	Michael D. Higgins	Labour Party
Kerry North	Tom McEllistrim	Fianna Fáil	Lost seat		Jimmy Deenihan	Fine Gael
Kerry South	Michael Moynihan	Labour Party	Lost seat		John O'Donoghue	Fianna Fáil
Kildare	Joseph Bermingham	Labour Party	Retired		Emmet Stagg	Labour Party
Laois–Offaly	Oliver J. Flanagan	Fine Gael	Retired	Son of outgoing TD	Charles Flanagan	Fine Gael
Limerick East	Tom O'Donnell	Fine Gael	Lost seat	Clohessy – former TD	Peadar Clohessy	Progressive Democrats
Limerick East	Frank Prendergast	Labour Party	Lost seat	Kemmy – former TD	Jim Kemmy	Democratic Socialist Party
Limerick West	William O'Brien	Fine Gael	Retired		John McCoy	Progressive Democrats
Longford–Westmeath	Gerry L'Estrange	Fine Gael	Retired		Henry Abbott	Fianna Fáil
Louth	Pádraig Faulkner	Fianna Fáil	Retired		Dermot Ahern	Fianna Fáil
Mayo East	No membership changes					
Mayo West	Paddy O'Toole	Fine Gael	Lost seat		Jim Higgins	Fine Gael
Meath	Jim Fitzsimons	Fianna Fáil	Retired		Noel Dempsey	Fianna Fáil
Roscommon	No membership changes					
Sligo–Leitrim	Joe McCartin	Fine Gael	Lost seat		John Ellis	Fianna Fáil
Tipperary North	David Molony	Fine Gael	Retired		Michael Lowry	Fine Gael
Tipperary South	No membership changes					
Waterford	Edward Collins	Fine Gael	Lost seat		Martin Cullen	Progressive Democrats
Waterford	Donal Ormonde	Fianna Fáil	Lost seat		Brian Swift	Fianna Fáil
Wexford	Michael D'Arcy	Fine Gael	Lost seat		Brendan Howlin	Labour Party
Wicklow	Godfrey Timmins	Fine Gael	Lost seat		Joe Jacob	Fianna Fáil
Wicklow	Paudge Brennan	Fianna Fáil	Retired		Dick Roche	Fianna Fáil

== Seanad election ==
The Dáil election was followed by an election to the 18th Seanad.
