= John Cregan (politician) =

Irish former politician (born 1961)

Teachta Dála
- In office May 2002 – February 2011
- Constituency: Limerick West

Senator
- In office 12 June 1998 – 12 September 2002
- Constituency: Labour Panel

Personal details
- Born: 21 May 1961 (age 63); Limerick, Ireland
- Political party: Fianna Fáil
- Spouse: Patsy Breen
- Children: 3

John Cregan (born 21 May 1961) is an Irish former Fianna Fáil politician who served as a Teachta Dála (TD) for the Limerick West constituency from 2002 to 2011 and as a Senator for the Labour Panel from 1998 to 2011.

He is from Dromcolliher, County Limerick.

On 23 June 1998, Cregan was elected to the 21st Seanad as a Senator for the Labour Panel, at a by-election to fill the seat vacated by the Labour Party Senator Seán Ryan, who had been elected to Dáil Éireann at a by-election.

Cregan was elected to Dáil Éireann at the 2002 general election as a Fianna Fáil TD for the Limerick West constituency and was re-elected at the 2007 general election.

On 1 February 2011, Cregan announced that he would not be a candidate at the imminent general election following disagreement with the new leader of Fianna Fáil, Micheál Martin.

He served as chairman of Limerick GAA County Board.

Dáil	Election	Deputy (Party)	Deputy (Party)	Deputy (Party)
13th	1948	James Collins (FF)	Donnchadh Ó Briain (FF)	David Madden (FG)
14th	1951	James Collins (FF)	Donnchadh Ó Briain (FF)	David Madden (FG)
15th	1954	James Collins (FF)	Donnchadh Ó Briain (FF)	David Madden (FG)
15th	1955 by-election	James Collins (FF)	Donnchadh Ó Briain (FF)	Michael Colbert (FF)
16th	1957	James Collins (FF)	Donnchadh Ó Briain (FF)	Denis Jones (FG)
17th	1961	James Collins (FF)	Donnchadh Ó Briain (FF)	Denis Jones (FG)
18th	1965	James Collins (FF)	Donnchadh Ó Briain (FF)	Denis Jones (FG)
18th	1967 by-election	Gerry Collins (FF)	Donnchadh Ó Briain (FF)	Denis Jones (FG)
19th	1969	Gerry Collins (FF)	Michael J. Noonan (FF)	Denis Jones (FG)
20th	1973	Gerry Collins (FF)	Michael J. Noonan (FF)	Denis Jones (FG)
21st	1977	Gerry Collins (FF)	Michael J. Noonan (FF)	William O'Brien (FG)
22nd	1981	Gerry Collins (FF)	Michael J. Noonan (FF)	William O'Brien (FG)
23rd	1982 (Feb)	Gerry Collins (FF)	Michael J. Noonan (FF)	William O'Brien (FG)
24th	1982 (Nov)	Gerry Collins (FF)	Michael J. Noonan (FF)	William O'Brien (FG)
25th	1987	Gerry Collins (FF)	Michael J. Noonan (FF)	John McCoy (PDs)
26th	1989	Gerry Collins (FF)	Michael J. Noonan (FF)	Michael Finucane (FG)
27th	1992	Gerry Collins (FF)	Michael J. Noonan (FF)	Michael Finucane (FG)
28th	1997	Michael Collins (FF)	Dan Neville (FG)	Michael Finucane (FG)
29th	2002	Michael Collins (FF)	Dan Neville (FG)	John Cregan (FF)
30th	2007	Niall Collins (FF)	Dan Neville (FG)	John Cregan (FF)
31st	2011	Constituency abolished. See Limerick and Kerry North–West Limerick		
