= William O'Brien (Fine Gael politician) =

Irish politician (1918–1994)

Teachta Dála
- In office June 1977 – February 1987
- Constituency: Limerick West

Senator
- In office 5 November 1969 – 16 June 1977
- Constituency: Labour Panel

Personal details
- Born: 6 March 1918 County Limerick, Ireland
- Died: 5 November 1994 (aged 76) County Limerick, Ireland
- Party: Fine Gael

William O'Brien (6 March 1918 – 5 November 1994) was a Fine Gael politician from County Limerick, Ireland. He was a senator from 1969 to 1977, and then a TD for Limerick West from 1977 to 1987.

Before entering politics, O'Brien was an employee of CIÉ, the state-run Irish transport company.

He stood unsuccessfully as a Fine Gael candidate for Dáil Éireann in the Limerick West constituency at the 1969 and 1973 general elections before winning the seat at the 1977 general election. After his 1969 defeat, he was elected to the 12th Seanad Éireann on the Labour Panel, which returned him in 1973 to the 13th Seanad.

Once in the Dáil, O'Brien was re-elected at the 1981 general election and at both the February 1982 and November 1982 general elections. He did not contest the 1987 general election, and retired from politics.

Dáil	Election	Deputy (Party)	Deputy (Party)	Deputy (Party)
13th	1948	James Collins (FF)	Donnchadh Ó Briain (FF)	David Madden (FG)
14th	1951	James Collins (FF)	Donnchadh Ó Briain (FF)	David Madden (FG)
15th	1954	James Collins (FF)	Donnchadh Ó Briain (FF)	David Madden (FG)
15th	1955 by-election	James Collins (FF)	Donnchadh Ó Briain (FF)	Michael Colbert (FF)
16th	1957	James Collins (FF)	Donnchadh Ó Briain (FF)	Denis Jones (FG)
17th	1961	James Collins (FF)	Donnchadh Ó Briain (FF)	Denis Jones (FG)
18th	1965	James Collins (FF)	Donnchadh Ó Briain (FF)	Denis Jones (FG)
18th	1967 by-election	Gerry Collins (FF)	Donnchadh Ó Briain (FF)	Denis Jones (FG)
19th	1969	Gerry Collins (FF)	Michael J. Noonan (FF)	Denis Jones (FG)
20th	1973	Gerry Collins (FF)	Michael J. Noonan (FF)	Denis Jones (FG)
21st	1977	Gerry Collins (FF)	Michael J. Noonan (FF)	William O'Brien (FG)
22nd	1981	Gerry Collins (FF)	Michael J. Noonan (FF)	William O'Brien (FG)
23rd	1982 (Feb)	Gerry Collins (FF)	Michael J. Noonan (FF)	William O'Brien (FG)
24th	1982 (Nov)	Gerry Collins (FF)	Michael J. Noonan (FF)	William O'Brien (FG)
25th	1987	Gerry Collins (FF)	Michael J. Noonan (FF)	John McCoy (PDs)
26th	1989	Gerry Collins (FF)	Michael J. Noonan (FF)	Michael Finucane (FG)
27th	1992	Gerry Collins (FF)	Michael J. Noonan (FF)	Michael Finucane (FG)
28th	1997	Michael Collins (FF)	Dan Neville (FG)	Michael Finucane (FG)
29th	2002	Michael Collins (FF)	Dan Neville (FG)	John Cregan (FF)
30th	2007	Niall Collins (FF)	Dan Neville (FG)	John Cregan (FF)
31st	2011	Constituency abolished. See Limerick and Kerry North–West Limerick		
