= Denis Jones =

Irish politician (1906–1987)

Leas-Cheann Comhairle of Dáil Éireann
- In office 15 November 1967 – 5 July 1977
- Ceann Comhairle: Cormac Breslin; Seán Treacy
- Preceded by: Cormac Breslin
- Succeeded by: Seán Browne

Teachta Dála
- In office March 1957 – June 1977
- Constituency: Limerick West

Personal details
- Born: 12 October 1906 County Limerick, Ireland
- Died: 6 May 1987 (aged 80) County Limerick, Ireland
- Party: Fine Gael
- Spouse: Anne O'Donnell
- Children: 4
- Education: St Patrick's College, Dublin

Denis Francis Jones (12 October 1906 – 6 May 1987) was an Irish Fine Gael politician. A school teacher by profession, he was an unsuccessful candidate at the December 1955 by-election. He was elected to Dáil Éireann as a Fine Gael Teachta Dála (TD) for the Limerick West constituency at the 1957 general election. He was re-elected at each subsequent general election until he retired from politics at the 1977 general election. He served as Leas-Cheann Comhairle (deputy chairperson) of the Dáil from 1967 to 1977, and Fine Gael spokesperson for education.

He was educated at Rockwell College, and St Patrick's College, Dublin, where he trained as a teacher. He married Anne O'Donnell, and they had four daughters. He was active in the GAA and Muintir na Tíre.

Dáil	Election	Deputy (Party)	Deputy (Party)	Deputy (Party)
13th	1948	James Collins (FF)	Donnchadh Ó Briain (FF)	David Madden (FG)
14th	1951	James Collins (FF)	Donnchadh Ó Briain (FF)	David Madden (FG)
15th	1954	James Collins (FF)	Donnchadh Ó Briain (FF)	David Madden (FG)
15th	1955 by-election	James Collins (FF)	Donnchadh Ó Briain (FF)	Michael Colbert (FF)
16th	1957	James Collins (FF)	Donnchadh Ó Briain (FF)	Denis Jones (FG)
17th	1961	James Collins (FF)	Donnchadh Ó Briain (FF)	Denis Jones (FG)
18th	1965	James Collins (FF)	Donnchadh Ó Briain (FF)	Denis Jones (FG)
18th	1967 by-election	Gerry Collins (FF)	Donnchadh Ó Briain (FF)	Denis Jones (FG)
19th	1969	Gerry Collins (FF)	Michael J. Noonan (FF)	Denis Jones (FG)
20th	1973	Gerry Collins (FF)	Michael J. Noonan (FF)	Denis Jones (FG)
21st	1977	Gerry Collins (FF)	Michael J. Noonan (FF)	William O'Brien (FG)
22nd	1981	Gerry Collins (FF)	Michael J. Noonan (FF)	William O'Brien (FG)
23rd	1982 (Feb)	Gerry Collins (FF)	Michael J. Noonan (FF)	William O'Brien (FG)
24th	1982 (Nov)	Gerry Collins (FF)	Michael J. Noonan (FF)	William O'Brien (FG)
25th	1987	Gerry Collins (FF)	Michael J. Noonan (FF)	John McCoy (PDs)
26th	1989	Gerry Collins (FF)	Michael J. Noonan (FF)	Michael Finucane (FG)
27th	1992	Gerry Collins (FF)	Michael J. Noonan (FF)	Michael Finucane (FG)
28th	1997	Michael Collins (FF)	Dan Neville (FG)	Michael Finucane (FG)
29th	2002	Michael Collins (FF)	Dan Neville (FG)	John Cregan (FF)
30th	2007	Niall Collins (FF)	Dan Neville (FG)	John Cregan (FF)
31st	2011	Constituency abolished. See Limerick and Kerry North–West Limerick		
