= 1989 Irish general election =

Election to the 26th Dáil

- 15 June 1989

166 seats in Dáil Éireann (Note: Including Seán Treacy (Ind), returned automatically for Tipperary South as outgoing Ceann Comhairle, under Art. 16.6 of the Constitution and the Electoral Act 1963, as amended.) 84 seats needed for a majority
- Turnout: 68.5% ▼4.8 pp
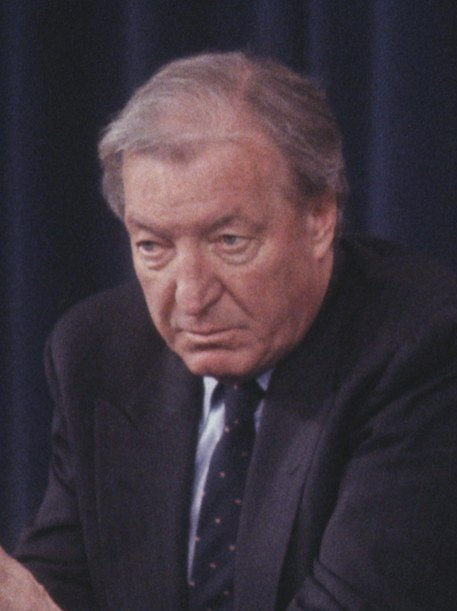

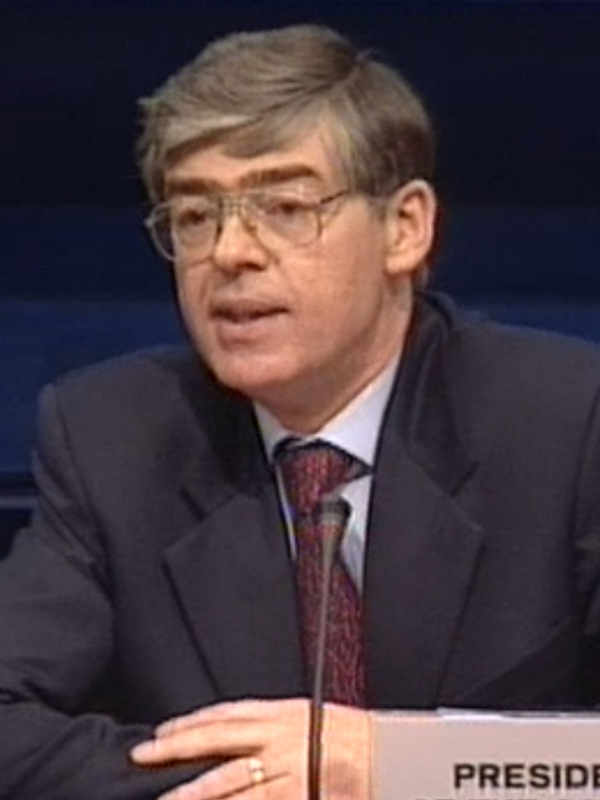

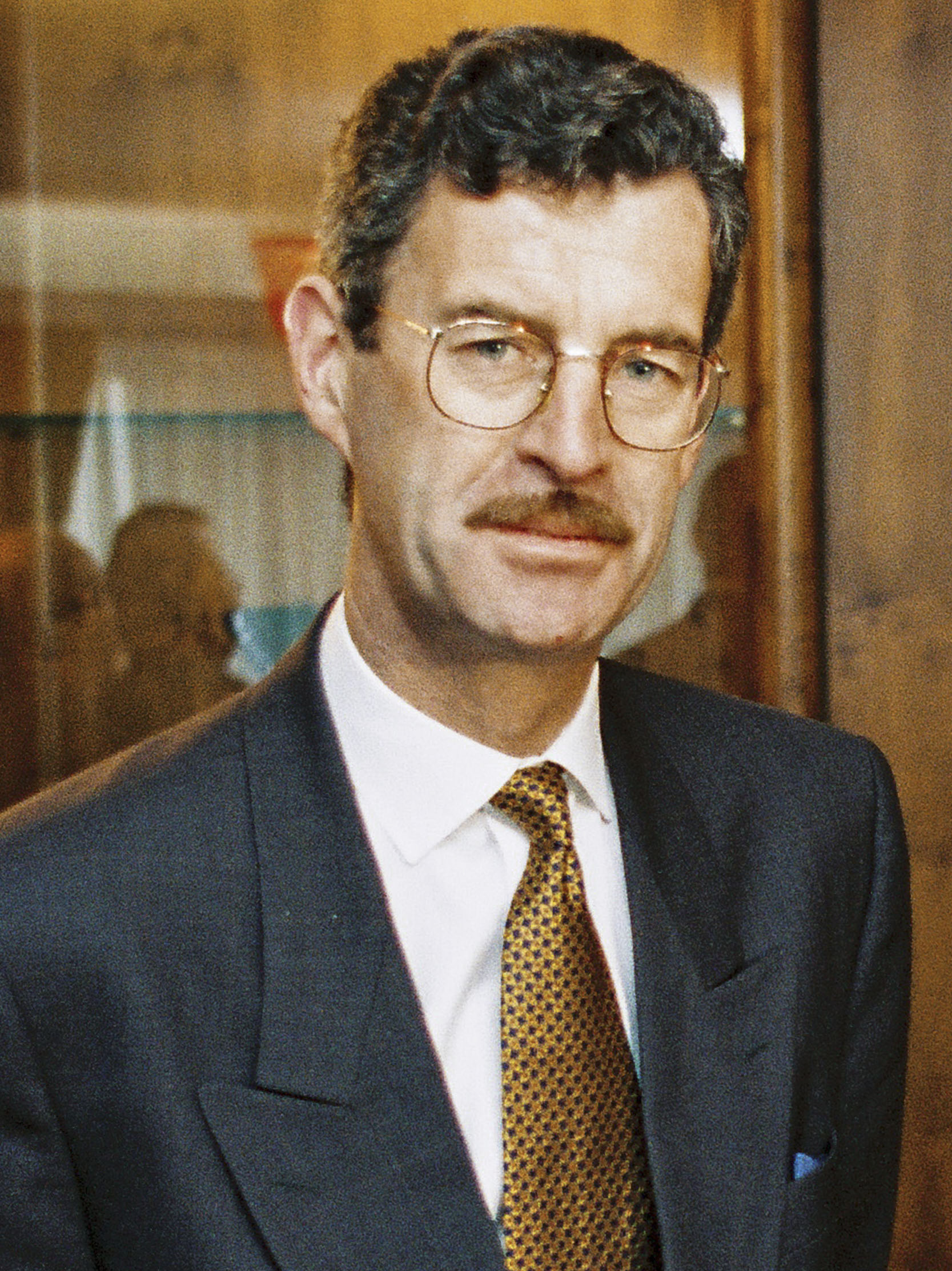

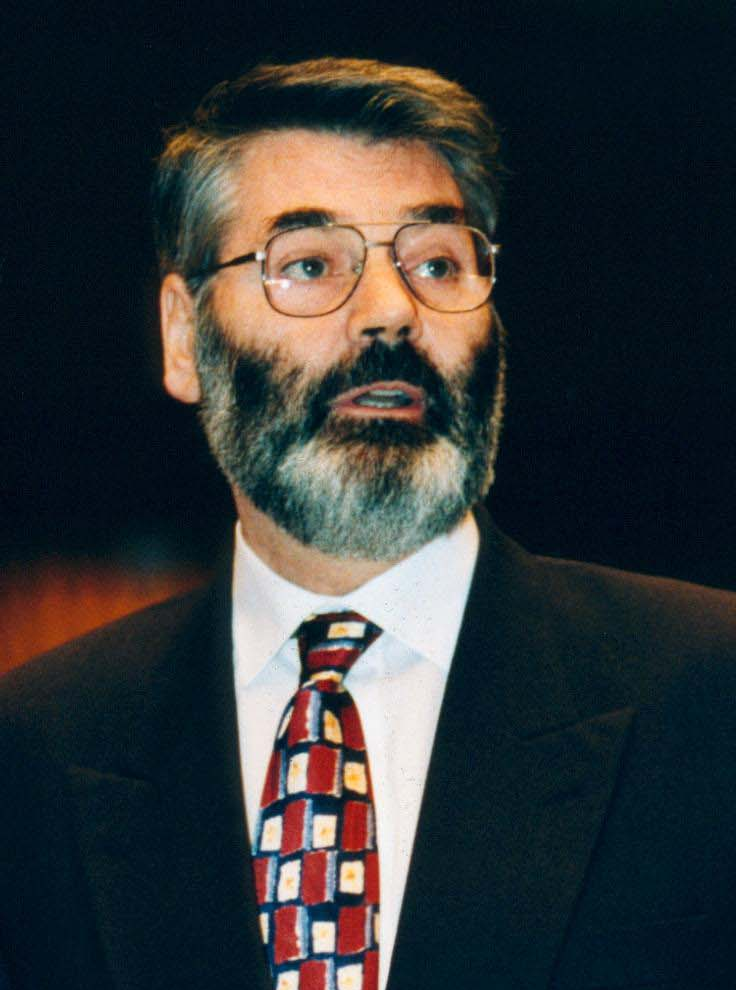

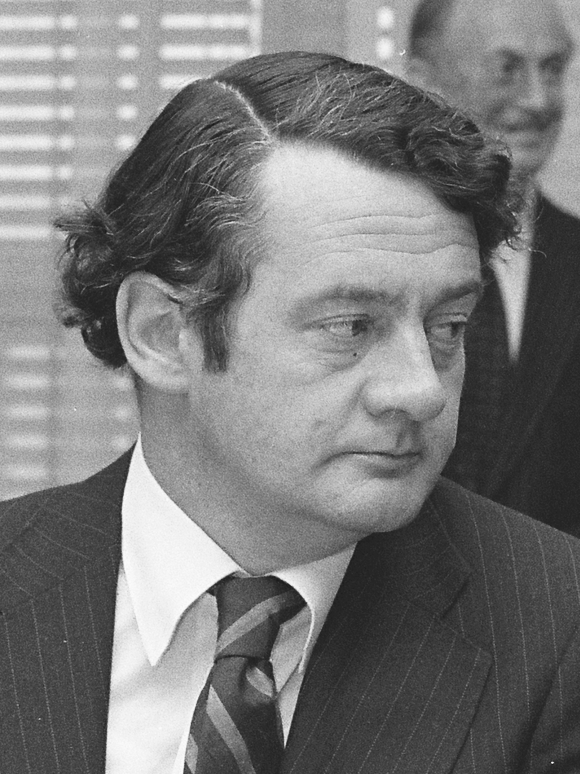
	First party	Second party	Third party
Leader	Charles Haughey	Alan Dukes	Dick Spring
Party	Fianna Fáil	Fine Gael	Labour
Leader since	7 December 1979	21 March 1987	November 1982
Leader's seat	Dublin North-Central	Kildare	Kerry North
Last election	81 seats, 44.1%	51 seats, 27.1%	12 seats, 6.5%
Seats won	77	55	15
Seat change	▼4	▲4	▲3
Popular vote	731,472	485,307	156,989
Percentage	44.1%	29.3%	9.5%
Swing	▼0.1 pp	▲2.2 pp	▲3.1 pp
	Fourth party	Fifth party	Sixth party
			GP
Leader	Proinsias De Rossa	Desmond O'Malley	—
Party	Workers' Party	Progressive Democrats	Green
Leader since	1988	21 December 1985	—
Leader's seat	Dublin North-West	Limerick East	—
Last election	4 seats, 3.8%	14 seats, 11.9%	0 seats, 0.4%
Seats won	7	6	1
Seat change	▲3	▼8	▲1
Popular vote	82,263	91,013	24,827
Percentage	5.0%	5.5%	1.5%
Swing	▲1.2 pp	▼6.3 pp	▲1.1 pp
Taoiseach before election
Charles Haughey
Fianna Fáil
Taoiseach after election
Charles Haughey
Fianna Fáil

The 1989 Irish general election to the 26th Dáil was held on Thursday, 15 June, three weeks after the dissolution of the 25th Dáil on 25 May by President Patrick Hillery, on the request of Taoiseach Charles Haughey. The general election took place in 41 Dáil constituencies throughout Ireland for 166 seats in Dáil Éireann, the house of representatives of the Oireachtas, on the same day as the European Parliament election.

The 26th Dáil met at Leinster House on 29 June to nominate the Taoiseach for appointment by the president and to approve the appointment of a new government of Ireland. No government was formed on that date, but on 12 July, Haughey was re-appointed Taoiseach, forming the 21st government of Ireland, a coalition government of Fianna Fáil and the Progressive Democrats.

== Campaign ==
The general election of 1989 was precipitated by the defeat of the minority Fianna Fáil government in a private members motion regarding the provision of funds for AIDS sufferers (haemophiliacs who had been infected with contaminated blood products by the health service). While a general election was not necessary – the motion was not a vote of confidence, and therefore defeat was merely an embarrassment for the government – Charles Haughey, the Fianna Fáil leader, sought a dissolution of the Dáil.

Opinion polls had shown that the party's strong performance in government had increased their popularity and an overall majority for Fianna Fáil could be a possibility. Also, rumours were current that the general election was called so that certain Fianna Fáil members could raise money privately for themselves. While these rumours were dismissed at the time, it was revealed more than ten years later that Ray Burke, Pádraig Flynn and Haughey himself had received substantial personal donations during the campaign.

While it was thought that the general election would catch the opposition parties unprepared, they co-ordinated themselves and co-operated very quickly. Further cuts in spending, particularly in the health service, became the dominant issue. Alan Dukes was fighting his first (and as events would prove, his only) general election as leader of Fine Gael. His Tallaght Strategy had kept Fianna Fáil in power, governing as a minority, since 1987.

The general election was held on the same day as the election to the European Parliament, and turnout was 68.5%.

== Results ==
Election to the 26th Dáil – 15 June 1989
Party	Leader	Seats	±	% of seats	First pref. votes	% FPv	±%
Fianna Fáil	Charles Haughey	77	▼4	46.4	731,472	44.1	0
Fine Gael	Alan Dukes	55	▲4	33.1	485,307	29.3	▲2.2
Labour	Dick Spring	15	▲3	9.1	156,989	9.5	▲3.1
Workers' Party	Proinsias De Rossa	7	▲3	4.2	82,263	5.0	▲1.2
Progressive Democrats	Desmond O'Malley	6	▼8	3.6	91,013	5.5	▼6.3
Green	None	1	▲1	0.6	24,827	1.5	▲1.1
Democratic Socialist	Jim Kemmy	1	0	0.6	9,836	0.6	▲0.2
Sinn Féin	Gerry Adams	0	0	0	20,003	1.2	▼0.7
Communist	James Stewart	0	0	0	342	0.0	—
Independent	N/A	4	▲1	2.4	54,761	3.3	▼0.7
Spoilt votes					20,779	—N/a	—N/a
Total		166	0	100	1,677,592	100	—N/a
Electorate/Turnout					2,448,810	68.5%	—N/a

Independents include Independent Fianna Fáil (6,961 votes, 1 seat), Army Wives (6,966 votes) and Gay candidates (517 votes).

No by-elections had taken place during the previous Dáil. Two seats were vacant at the dissolution of the 25th Dáil: in Sligo–Leitrim, caused by the resignation of the Fianna Fáil member Ray MacSharry, and in Dublin South-Central, caused by the death of Frank Cluskey.

While Fianna Fáil had hoped to achieve an overall majority, the party lost seats. The result was a disaster for Fianna Fáil, particularly when the election was so unnecessary. Fine Gael made a small gain, but nothing substantial. The Progressive Democrats did badly, losing over half their deputies. The Labour Party and the Workers' Party gained working-class votes from Fianna Fáil but failed to make the big breakthrough, while Sinn Féin polled worse than its 1987 result. The Green Party won its first seat when Roger Garland was elected for Dublin South.

=== Voting summary ===
First preference vote
Fianna Fáil	44.15%
Fine Gael	29.29%
Labour	9.48%
Progressive Democrats	5.49%
Workers'	4.97%
Green	1.50%
Sinn Féin	1.21%
Others	0.61%
Independent	3.31%

=== Seats summary ===
Dáil seats
Fianna Fáil	46.39%
Fine Gael	33.13%
Labour	9.03%
Workers'	4.22%
Progressive Democrats	3.61%
Green	0.60%
Democratic Socialist	0.60%
Independent	2.41%

== Government formation ==
Forming a government proved to be extremely difficult. Many in Fianna Fáil had hoped that the minority government could continue where it left off, particularly if the Tallaght Strategy continued. However, Fine Gael refused to support the government and so a deadlock developed. The prospect of forming a government seemed remote, so much so that Charles Haughey was forced to formally resign as Taoiseach. For the first time in Irish history a Taoiseach and a government had not been appointed when the new Dáil met. However, twenty-seven days after the general election, Fianna Fáil entered into a coalition for the first time in its history – with the Progressive Democrats, forming the 21st Government of Ireland, led by Haughey as Taoiseach. In February 1992, Haughey resigned and was succeeded as Taoiseach by Albert Reynolds, forming the 22nd Government of Ireland, continuing in coalition with the Progressive Democrats.

== Dáil membership changes ==
The following changes took place as a result of the election:

- 14 outgoing TDs retired
- 1 vacant seat at election time
- 150 outgoing TDs stood for re-election (also Seán Treacy, the outgoing Ceann Comhairle who was automatically returned)
  - 124 of those were re-elected
  - 26 failed to be re-elected
- 41 successor TDs were elected
  - 32 were elected for the first time
  - 9 had previously been TDs
- There were 4 successor female TDs, replacing 5 outgoing, thus reducing the total by 1 to 13
- There were changes in 30 of the 41 constituencies contested

Where more than one change took place in a constituency the concept of successor is an approximation for presentation only.

Constituency	Departing TD	Party	Change	Comment	Successor TD	Party
Carlow–Kilkenny	Kieran Crotty	Fine Gael	Retired		John Browne	Fine Gael
Carlow–Kilkenny	Martin Gibbons	Progressive Democrats	Lost seat		Phil Hogan	Fine Gael
Cavan–Monaghan	Tom Fitzpatrick	Fine Gael	Retired		Bill Cotter	Fine Gael
Clare	No membership changes					
Cork East	Patrick Hegarty	Fine Gael	Lost seat		Paul Bradford	Fine Gael
Cork North-Central	Liam Burke	Fine Gael	Lost seat		Gerry O'Sullivan	Labour Party
Cork North-West	Donal Moynihan	Fianna Fáil	Lost seat		Laurence Kelly	Fianna Fáil
Cork North-West	Donal Creed	Fine Gael	Retired	Son of outgoing TD	Michael Creed	Fine Gael
Cork South-Central	Batt O'Keeffe	Fianna Fáil	Lost seat		Micheál Martin	Fianna Fáil
Cork South-West	No membership changes					
Donegal North-East	Hugh Conaghan	Fianna Fáil	Lost seat		Jim McDaid	Fianna Fáil
Donegal South-West	No membership changes					
Dublin Central	Michael Keating	Progressive Democrats	Retired		Pat Lee	Fine Gael
Dublin North	John Boland	Fine Gael	Lost seat	Owen – Former TD	Nora Owen	Fine Gael
Dublin North	G. V. Wright	Fianna Fáil	Lost seat		Seán Ryan	Labour Party
Dublin North-Central	George Birmingham	Fine Gael	Lost seat		Ivor Callely	Fianna Fáil
Dublin North-East	No membership changes					
Dublin North-West	No membership changes					
Dublin South	John Kelly	Fine Gael	Retired	Fennell – Former TD	Nuala Fennell	Fine Gael
Dublin South	Anne Colley	Progressive Democrats	Lost seat		Roger Garland	Green Party
Dublin South-Central	Frank Cluskey	Labour Party	Vacant seat (Note: Cluskey had died on 7 May 1989.)		Eric Byrne	Workers' Party
Dublin South-Central	Mary Mooney	Fianna Fáil	Lost seat	O'Connell – Former TD	John O'Connell	Fianna Fáil
Dublin South-East	Michael McDowell	Progressive Democrats	Lost seat	Doyle – Former TD	Joe Doyle	Fine Gael
Dublin South-West	Seán Walsh	Fianna Fáil	Lost Seat		Pat Rabbitte	Workers' Party
Dublin West	Patrick O'Malley	Progressive Democrats	Lost seat		Austin Currie	Fine Gael
Dún Laoghaire	Barry Desmond	Labour Party	Retired		Eamon Gilmore	Workers' Party
Dún Laoghaire	Geraldine Kennedy	Progressive Democrats	Lost seat		Brian Hillery	Fianna Fáil
Galway East	No membership changes					
Galway West	John Donnellan	Fine Gael	Retired		Pádraic McCormack	Fine Gael
Kerry North	Denis Foley	Fianna Fáil	Lost seat	McEllistrim – Former TD	Tom McEllistrim	Fianna Fáil
Kerry South	Michael Begley	Fine Gael	Lost seat	Moynihan – Former TD	Michael Moynihan	Labour Party
Kildare	Paddy Power	Fianna Fáil	Retired		Seán Power	Fianna Fáil
Laois–Offaly	No membership changes					
Limerick East	No membership changes					
Limerick West	John McCoy	Progressive Democrats	Retired		Michael Finucane	Fine Gael
Longford–Westmeath	Henry Abbott	Fianna Fáil	Lost seat		Louis Belton	Fine Gael
Longford–Westmeath	Patrick Cooney	Fine Gael	Retired		Paul McGrath	Fine Gael
Louth	No membership changes					
Mayo East	No membership changes					
Mayo West	Denis Gallagher	Fianna Fáil	Retired		Martin O'Toole	Fianna Fáil
Meath	Michael Lynch	Fianna Fáil	Lost seat		Mary Wallace	Fianna Fáil
Roscommon	Seán Doherty	Fianna Fáil	Lost seat		Tom Foxe	Independent
Roscommon	Liam Naughten	Fine Gael	Lost seat	Connor – Former TD	John Connor	Fine Gael
Sligo–Leitrim	Ray MacSharry	Fianna Fáil	Resigned (Note: Ray MacSharry became European Commissioner in 1988. The writ for the by-election was issued on 16 May 1989, but the ensuing by-election was cancelled due to the dissolution of the Dáil.)		Gerry Reynolds	Fine Gael
Tipperary North	No membership changes					
Tipperary South	Brendan Griffin	Fine Gael	Lost seat		Theresa Ahearn	Fine Gael
Tipperary South	Seán McCarthy	Fianna Fáil	Lost seat		Michael Ferris	Labour Party
Waterford	Brian Swift	Fianna Fáil	Lost seat		Brendan Kenneally	Fianna Fáil
Waterford	Martin Cullen	Progressive Democrats	Lost seat		Brian O'Shea	Labour Party
Wexford	Hugh Byrne	Fianna Fáil	Lost seat		Séamus Cullimore	Fianna Fáil
Wexford	Avril Doyle	Fine Gael	Lost seat	D'Arcy – Former TD	Michael D'Arcy	Fine Gael
Wicklow	Gemma Hussey	Fine Gael	Retired	Timmins – Former TD	Godfrey Timmins	Fine Gael

== Seanad election ==
The Dáil election was followed by the election to the 19th Seanad.
