= G. V. Wright =

Irish former politician (born 1947)

Leader of the Seanad
- In office 23 January 1992 – 20 December 1994
- Taoiseach: Albert Reynolds
- Preceded by: Seán Fallon
- Succeeded by: Maurice Manning

Teachta Dála
- In office June 1997 – May 2007
- In office February 1987 – June 1989
- Constituency: Dublin North

Senator
- In office 1 November 1989 – 6 June 1997
- In office 13 May 1982 – 23 February 1983
- Constituency: Nominated by the Taoiseach

Personal details
- Born: 3 August 1947 (age 78) Dublin, Ireland
- Party: Fianna Fáil
- Education: Chanel College, Dublin

Thomas Wright, usually referred to by the nickname G.V., (born 3 August 1947) is an Irish former Fianna Fáil politician. He was a Teachta Dála (TD) for the Dublin North constituency.

Wright was born in Dublin in 1947. He was educated at Chanel College, Coolock in Dublin before becoming a food retailer. In his youth, Wright played Gaelic football for the Dublin county team and was an international basketball player and coach. He first held public office in 1982, when he was nominated by the Taoiseach to Seanad Éireann. He remained there until 1983; however, he also entered local politics in 1985 as a member of Dublin County Council. He remained there until 2004. The Mahon Tribunal named him in its final report as one of a number of politicians who had received corrupt payments from property developers.

Wright was elected to Dáil Éireann at the 1987 general election. He lost his seat at the 1989 general election but was again nominated to the Seanad where he served as Leader of Seanad Éireann (1991–1994) and Leader of Fianna Fáil in Seanad Éireann (1994–1997). During this time Wright failed again to obtain re-election to the Dáil. He finally succeeded at the 1997 general election and held his seat in another election in 2002.

In September 2003, as Wright drove home from Leinster House, he hit a female pedestrian at North Strand in Dublin causing multiple fractures to her leg. Tests confirmed that Wright's blood alcohol content was above the legal limit. As a result, he was fined and banned from driving for two years. In a statement, he said: "I wish to unreservedly apologise to the person whom I injured and her family for this serious lapse of personal responsibility on my part and wish her a complete and expeditious recovery."

He retired from politics at the 2007 general election.

In March 2012, the final report of the Mahon Tribunal found that Wright received a £5,000 "corrupt" payment from Christopher Jones in November 1992 in relation to the Ballycullen/Beechill rezoning projects. On 27 March 2012, Wright resigned from Fianna Fáil before he could be expelled.

| Dáil | Election | Deputy (Party) | Deputy (Party) | Deputy (Party) | Deputy (Party) | Deputy (Party) | Deputy (Party) | Deputy (Party) | Deputy (Party) |
|---|---|---|---|---|---|---|---|---|---|
| 4th | 1923 | Alfie Byrne (Ind.) | Francis Cahill (CnaG) | Margaret Collins-O'Driscoll (CnaG) | Seán McGarry (CnaG) | William Hewat (BP) | Richard Mulcahy (CnaG) | Seán T. O'Kelly (Rep) | Ernie O'Malley (Rep) |
| 4th | 1925 by-election | Alfie Byrne (Ind.) | Patrick Leonard (CnaG) | Margaret Collins-O'Driscoll (CnaG) | Oscar Traynor (Rep) | William Hewat (BP) | Richard Mulcahy (CnaG) | Seán T. O'Kelly (Rep) | Ernie O'Malley (Rep) |
| 5th | 1927 (Jun) | Alfie Byrne (Ind.) | John Byrne (CnaG) | Margaret Collins-O'Driscoll (CnaG) | Oscar Traynor (SF) | Denis Cullen (Lab) | Richard Mulcahy (CnaG) | Seán T. O'Kelly (FF) | Kathleen Clarke (FF) |
| 6th | 1927 (Sep) | Alfie Byrne (Ind.) | John Byrne (CnaG) | Margaret Collins-O'Driscoll (CnaG) | Patrick Leonard (CnaG) | James Larkin (IWL) | Richard Mulcahy (CnaG) | Seán T. O'Kelly (FF) | Eamonn Cooney (FF) |
| 6th | 1928 by-election | Alfie Byrne (Ind.) | John Byrne (CnaG) | Margaret Collins-O'Driscoll (CnaG) | Patrick Leonard (CnaG) | Vincent Rice (CnaG) | Richard Mulcahy (CnaG) | Seán T. O'Kelly (FF) | Eamonn Cooney (FF) |
| 6th | 1929 by-election | Thomas F. O'Higgins (CnaG) | John Byrne (CnaG) | Margaret Collins-O'Driscoll (CnaG) | Patrick Leonard (CnaG) | Vincent Rice (CnaG) | Richard Mulcahy (CnaG) | Seán T. O'Kelly (FF) | Eamonn Cooney (FF) |
| 7th | 1932 | Alfie Byrne (Ind.) | John Byrne (CnaG) | Margaret Collins-O'Driscoll (CnaG) | Oscar Traynor (FF) | Cormac Breathnach (FF) | Richard Mulcahy (CnaG) | Seán T. O'Kelly (FF) | Eamonn Cooney (FF) |
| 8th | 1933 | Alfie Byrne (Ind.) | Patrick Belton (CnaG) | Vincent Rice (CnaG) | Oscar Traynor (FF) | Cormac Breathnach (FF) | Richard Mulcahy (CnaG) | Seán T. O'Kelly (FF) | Eamonn Cooney (FF) |
| 9th | 1937 | Constituency abolished. See Dublin North-East and Dublin North-West | | | | | | | |

| Dáil | Election | Deputy (Party) | Deputy (Party) | Deputy (Party) | Deputy (Party) |
|---|---|---|---|---|---|
| 22nd | 1981 | Ray Burke (FF) | John Boland (FG) | Nora Owen (FG) | 3 seats 1981–1992 |
| 23rd | 1982 (Feb) | Ray Burke (FF) | John Boland (FG) | Nora Owen (FG) | 3 seats 1981–1992 |
| 24th | 1982 (Nov) | Ray Burke (FF) | John Boland (FG) | Nora Owen (FG) | 3 seats 1981–1992 |
| 25th | 1987 | Ray Burke (FF) | John Boland (FG) | G. V. Wright (FF) | 3 seats 1981–1992 |
| 26th | 1989 | Ray Burke (FF) | Nora Owen (FG) | Seán Ryan (Lab) | 3 seats 1981–1992 |
| 27th | 1992 | Ray Burke (FF) | Nora Owen (FG) | Seán Ryan (Lab) | Trevor Sargent (GP) |
| 28th | 1997 | Ray Burke (FF) | Nora Owen (FG) | G. V. Wright (FF) | Trevor Sargent (GP) |
| 28th | 1998 by-election | Seán Ryan (Lab) | Nora Owen (FG) | G. V. Wright (FF) | Trevor Sargent (GP) |
| 29th | 2002 | Seán Ryan (Lab) | Jim Glennon (FF) | G. V. Wright (FF) | Trevor Sargent (GP) |
| 30th | 2007 | James Reilly (FG) | Michael Kennedy (FF) | Darragh O'Brien (FF) | Trevor Sargent (GP) |
| 31st | 2011 | James Reilly (FG) | Alan Farrell (FG) | Brendan Ryan (Lab) | Clare Daly (SP) |
| 32nd | 2016 | Constituency abolished. See Dublin Fingal | | | |
