= Martin Cullen =

Irish former politician (born 1954)

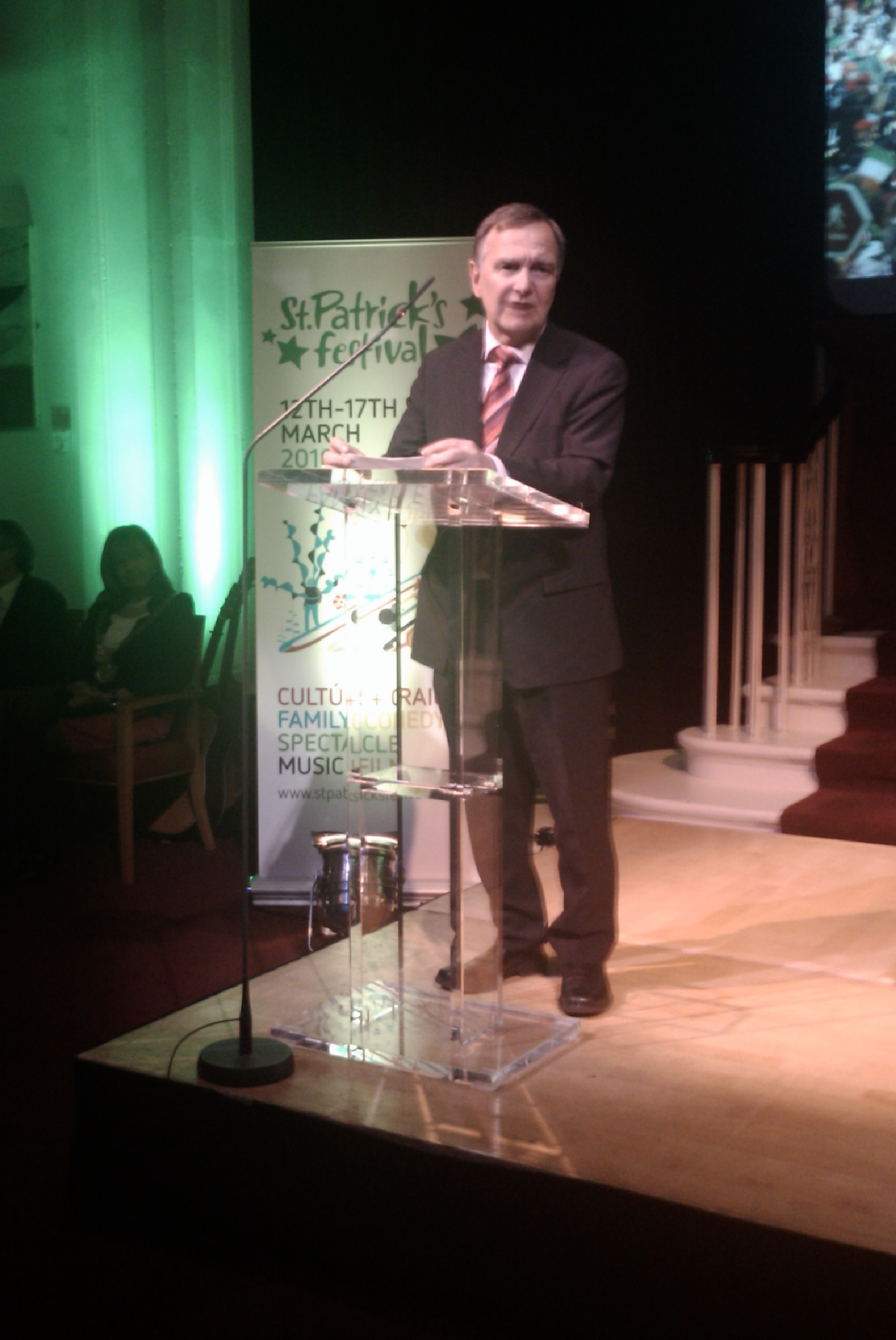
- Cullen in 2010

Minister for Arts, Sport and Tourism
- In office 7 May 2008 – 23 March 2010
- Taoiseach: Brian Cowen
- Preceded by: Séamus Brennan
- Succeeded by: Mary Hanafin

Minister for Social and Family Affairs
- In office 14 June 2007 – 7 May 2008
- Taoiseach: Bertie Ahern
- Preceded by: Séamus Brennan
- Succeeded by: Mary Hanafin

Minister for Transport
- In office 29 September 2004 – 14 June 2007
- Taoiseach: Bertie Ahern
- Preceded by: Séamus Brennan
- Succeeded by: Noel Dempsey

Minister for the Environment, Heritage and Local Government
- In office 6 June 2002 – 29 September 2004
- Taoiseach: Bertie Ahern
- Preceded by: Noel Dempsey
- Succeeded by: Dick Roche

Minister of State
- 1997–2002: Finance

Teachta Dála
- In office November 1992 – March 2010
- In office February 1987 – June 1989
- Constituency: Waterford

Senator
- In office 1 November 1989 – 25 November 1992
- Constituency: Nominated by the Taoiseach

Personal details
- Born: 2 November 1954 (age 71) Waterford, Ireland
- Party: Fianna Fáil
- Other political affiliations: Progressive Democrats (until 1994)
- Children: 4
- Education: Waterford Institute of Technology

Martin Cullen (born 2 November 1954) is an Irish former Fianna Fáil politician who served as Minister for Arts, Sport and Tourism from 2008 to 2010, Minister for Social and Family Affairs from 2007 to 2008, Minister for Transport from 2004 to 2007, Minister for the Environment, Heritage and Local Government from 2002 to 2004 and Minister of State at the Department of Finance from 1997 to 2002. He served as a Teachta Dála (TD) for the Waterford constituency from 1987 to 1989 and from 1992 to 2010. He was a Senator from 1989 to 1992, after being nominated by the Taoiseach.

== Background, early and private life ==
Martin Cullen was born in Waterford in 1954. He was educated at Waterpark College and the Regional Technical College, Waterford. He is married and has four children – three sons and one daughter. However, in late 2004 he stated that he was separated from his wife, Dorthe.

Cullen's father and grandfather had been Mayor of Waterford, a position Martin Cullen himself later occupied in 1993–1994.

Cullen worked as a sales manager for a wine company before becoming interested in politics. He was also Chief Executive of the Irish Transport Operators.

== Political career ==
Cullen was one of 14 Progressive Democrats TDs elected to Dáil Éireann at the 1987 general election, the first election after the party was founded. During his first period as a TD he served as his party's spokesperson on Tourism, Transport and Communications (1987–1988) and Industry and Commerce (1988–1989). Cullen lost his seat at the 1989 general election but was subsequently nominated by the Taoiseach to Seanad Éireann. During the intervening period he was elected to Waterford City Council, before returning to the Dáil at the 1992 general election.

In the following year Cullen was appointed party spokesperson on Enterprise and Employment. He became disillusioned with the party, and joined Fianna Fáil in September 1994.

=== Ahern Government ===
In 1997, Cullen was appointed Minister of State at the Department of Finance by the Fianna Fáil–Progressive Democrats coalition government that came to office after the general election. He was given responsibility for the Office of Public Works where he made huge progress in restoring the reputation of that department with number of high-profile projects, such as Leinster House 2000 and the purchase of the Farmleigh estate from Edward Guinness.

After the Government's re-election in 2002, Cullen joined the Cabinet as Minister for the Environment, Heritage and Local Government. As Minister responsible for elections, he inherited a previous government decision to move to an electronic-based system which was successfully tested by the previous government. However a media-led campaign which became highly politicized, derailed public confidence in the new system coupled with a desire to retain the old paper system. The electronic system was ultimately scrapped by government years later. He took a strong interest in Environmental Policies and introduced the highly successful "Race Against Waste Campaign" which had a huge impact on how domestic waste was separated and collected. Ireland assumed the European Presidency during his tenure, and he became President of the European Environmental Council and played a significant role at the world Earth Summits.

In a cabinet reshuffle in 2004 Cullen was appointed Minister for Transport. During that appointment he became embroiled in even more controversy. Two independent reports have cleared him of any wrongdoing in the awarding of lucrative Public Relations contracts to Monica Leech, who subsequently became President of Waterford Chambers of Commerce.

With the support of a majority of Dáil Éireann, he was the minister responsible for the stock market flotation of Aer Lingus, Ireland's national airline. According to the government this was done as the EU would not easily permit direct government investment in the airline. The sale included Aer Lingus' access slots to various airports including London Heathrow Airport. Some critics at the time suggested that it was important that Ireland, as an island nation, retain control of an airline in order to ensure connectivity to nearby countries. In May 2005, Minister Cullen told Dáil Éireann that "in the context of any decision to reduce State ownership in Aer Lingus, all the options available within the regulatory framework will be examined to ensure adequate ongoing access to Heathrow for Irish consumers". Others, including members of Seanad Éireann and Dáil Éireann raised the issue of the Heathrow slots.

Shortly after the privatisation, Irish-based private airline Ryanair attempted a takeover of Aer Lingus which was eventually blocked by other shareholders including the government (who retained a 28.3% share), Aer Lingus employee groups and Irish businessman Denis O'Brien. Cullen maintained throughout that the sale of Aer Lingus was "the right decision".

In August 2007, Aer Lingus announced that it would cease flying from Shannon Airport to London Heathrow Airport, instead using its Heathrow slots to fly from Belfast International Airport in Northern Ireland. This decision caused considerable controversy in the Republic of Ireland. principally due to the loss of connectivity from businesses in the West of Ireland to a major international hub. Local representatives in the Shannon area have claimed that Minister Cullen ignored calls to ring-fence slots for Shannon airport. The airport access slots are held by Aer Lingus for historical reasons, as the national carrier for the Republic of Ireland. This was the first time since the privatisation of Aer Lingus that traditional Irish slots were transferred outside the state. Aer Lingus has admitted that it has further slots to lease at Heathrow. It has also been revealed that it intended removing flights from Cork Airport.

=== 30th Dáil ===
Following the 2007 general election, he was appointed as Minister for Social and Family Affairs.

On 7 May 2008, when Brian Cowen became Taoiseach, Cullen was appointed as Minister for Arts, Sport and Tourism. He commented a week later, "My private life has all been about the arts. There's probably not an opera theatre in the world that I haven't been in, all in my own private time, I hasten to add".

In December 2008 he courted controversy by commenting on national radio that he would be supportive of having an Irish football club taking part in England's Premier League, despite the damage such a development would have on domestic football in Ireland, and the comments were also seen as unsuitable for the Minister for Arts, Sports, and Tourism. His comments that he would like to "see a European [football] team playing out of Dublin" suggested he was not aware of, or interested in, the six Dublin-based teams currently playing in domestic football.

In March 2009, a helicopter which was carrying him from Killarney to Dublin made an emergency landing shortly after take-off, because a door had fallen off. The minister was uninjured, but was reported to be "shaken". It was reported that the flight had cost nearly €6,000. Cullen dismissed criticism of his use of the Air Corps helicopter, and said there had been no unnecessary spending on his travel.

On 21 January 2010, he published his speech to the forum on Defamation Law, in which he spoke of his experiences of false allegations of adultery in the press. He felt it had been "like waking up every morning and being raped", that he had been photographed on the front pages of Sunday newspapers for 13 consecutive weeks and that his sons had "had the living daylights" beaten out of them for defending their father's honour and had to be removed from school due to "horrendous bullying". Cullen described how he had been pursued by the media, with reporters harassing him, photographers following him, even once a photograph of him, the Taoiseach and his secretary, and a third man at a state function was altered to make it appear he was dining alone with the woman. "The impacts on one's life are completely horrendous. I would go so far as to say in my case they are life-changing," he said. He later defended his use of the word "rape".

Cullen announced his resignation from his ministerial office and as a TD on 8 March 2010, due to a back ailment that had been troubling him severely in the preceding months. He stepped down from cabinet on 23 March 2010 when Brian Cowen announced a cabinet reshuffle and resigned as a TD the following day.

Political offices
| Preceded by Hugh Coveney | Minister of State at the Department of Finance; 1997–2002 | Succeeded by Tom Parlon |
| Preceded by Noel Dempsey | Minister for the Environment, Heritage and Local Government; 2002–2004 | Succeeded by Dick Roche |
| Preceded by Séamus Brennan | Minister for Transport; 2004–2007 | Succeeded by Noel Dempsey |
| Preceded by Séamus Brennan | Minister for Social and Family Affairs; 2007–2008 | Succeeded by Mary Hanafin |
| Preceded by Séamus Brennan | Minister for Arts, Sport and Tourism; 2008–2010 | Succeeded by Mary Hanafin as Minister for Tourism, Culture and Sport |

| Dáil | Election | Deputy (Party) | Deputy (Party) | Deputy (Party) | Deputy (Party) |
|---|---|---|---|---|---|
| 4th | 1923 | Caitlín Brugha (Rep) | John Butler (Lab) | Nicholas Wall (FP) | William Redmond (NL) |
| 5th | 1927 (Jun) | Caitlín Brugha (Rep) | Patrick Little (FF) | Vincent White (CnaG) | William Redmond (NL) |
| 6th | 1927 (Sep) | Seán Goulding (FF) | Patrick Little (FF) | Vincent White (CnaG) | William Redmond (NL) |
| 7th | 1932 | Seán Goulding (FF) | Patrick Little (FF) | John Kiersey (CnaG) | William Redmond (CnaG) |
| 8th | 1933 | Seán Goulding (FF) | Patrick Little (FF) | Nicholas Wall (NCP) | Bridget Redmond (CnaG) |
| 9th | 1937 | Michael Morrissey (FF) | Patrick Little (FF) | Nicholas Wall (FG) | Bridget Redmond (FG) |
| 10th | 1938 | Michael Morrissey (FF) | Patrick Little (FF) | William Broderick (FG) | Bridget Redmond (FG) |
| 11th | 1943 | Michael Morrissey (FF) | Patrick Little (FF) | Denis Heskin (CnaT) | Bridget Redmond (FG) |
| 12th | 1944 | Michael Morrissey (FF) | Patrick Little (FF) | Denis Heskin (CnaT) | Bridget Redmond (FG) |
| 12th | 1947 by-election | John Ormonde (FF) | Patrick Little (FF) | Denis Heskin (CnaT) | Bridget Redmond (FG) |
| 13th | 1948 | John Ormonde (FF) | Patrick Little (FF) | Thomas Kyne (Lab) | Bridget Redmond (FG) |
| 14th | 1951 | John Ormonde (FF) | Patrick Little (FF) | Thomas Kyne (Lab) | Bridget Redmond (FG) |
| 14th | 1952 by-election | John Ormonde (FF) | Patrick Little (FF) | Thomas Kyne (Lab) | William Kenneally (FF) |
| 15th | 1954 | John Ormonde (FF) | Thaddeus Lynch (FG) | Thomas Kyne (Lab) | William Kenneally (FF) |
| 16th | 1957 | John Ormonde (FF) | Thaddeus Lynch (FG) | Thomas Kyne (Lab) | William Kenneally (FF) |
| 17th | 1961 | John Ormonde (FF) | Thaddeus Lynch (FG) | Thomas Kyne (Lab) | 3 seats 1961–1977 |
| 18th | 1965 | Billy Kenneally (FF) | Thaddeus Lynch (FG) | Thomas Kyne (Lab) | 3 seats 1961–1977 |
| 18th | 1966 by-election | Billy Kenneally (FF) | Fad Browne (FF) | Thomas Kyne (Lab) | 3 seats 1961–1977 |
| 19th | 1969 | Billy Kenneally (FF) | Fad Browne (FF) | Edward Collins (FG) | 3 seats 1961–1977 |
| 20th | 1973 | Billy Kenneally (FF) | Thomas Kyne (Lab) | Edward Collins (FG) | 3 seats 1961–1977 |
| 21st | 1977 | Billy Kenneally (FF) | Jackie Fahey (FF) | Edward Collins (FG) | Austin Deasy (FG) |
| 22nd | 1981 | Billy Kenneally (FF) | Jackie Fahey (FF) | Edward Collins (FG) | Austin Deasy (FG) |
| 23rd | 1982 (Feb) | Paddy Gallagher (SF–WP) | Jackie Fahey (FF) | Edward Collins (FG) | Austin Deasy (FG) |
| 24th | 1982 (Nov) | Donal Ormonde (FF) | Jackie Fahey (FF) | Edward Collins (FG) | Austin Deasy (FG) |
| 25th | 1987 | Martin Cullen (PDs) | Jackie Fahey (FF) | Brian Swift (FF) | Austin Deasy (FG) |
| 26th | 1989 | Brian O'Shea (Lab) | Jackie Fahey (FF) | Brendan Kenneally (FF) | Austin Deasy (FG) |
| 27th | 1992 | Brian O'Shea (Lab) | Martin Cullen (PDs) | Brendan Kenneally (FF) | Austin Deasy (FG) |
| 28th | 1997 | Brian O'Shea (Lab) | Martin Cullen (FF) | Brendan Kenneally (FF) | Austin Deasy (FG) |
| 29th | 2002 | Brian O'Shea (Lab) | Martin Cullen (FF) | Ollie Wilkinson (FF) | John Deasy (FG) |
| 30th | 2007 | Brian O'Shea (Lab) | Martin Cullen (FF) | Brendan Kenneally (FF) | John Deasy (FG) |
| 31st | 2011 | Ciara Conway (Lab) | John Halligan (Ind.) | Paudie Coffey (FG) | John Deasy (FG) |
| 32nd | 2016 | David Cullinane (SF) | John Halligan (Ind.) | Mary Butler (FF) | John Deasy (FG) |
| 33rd | 2020 | David Cullinane (SF) | Marc Ó Cathasaigh (GP) | Mary Butler (FF) | Matt Shanahan (Ind.) |
| 34th | 2024 | David Cullinane (SF) | Conor D. McGuinness (SF) | Mary Butler (FF) | John Cummins (FG) |
