= Meanus =

Village in County Limerick, Ireland

Meanus Méanas
- Village
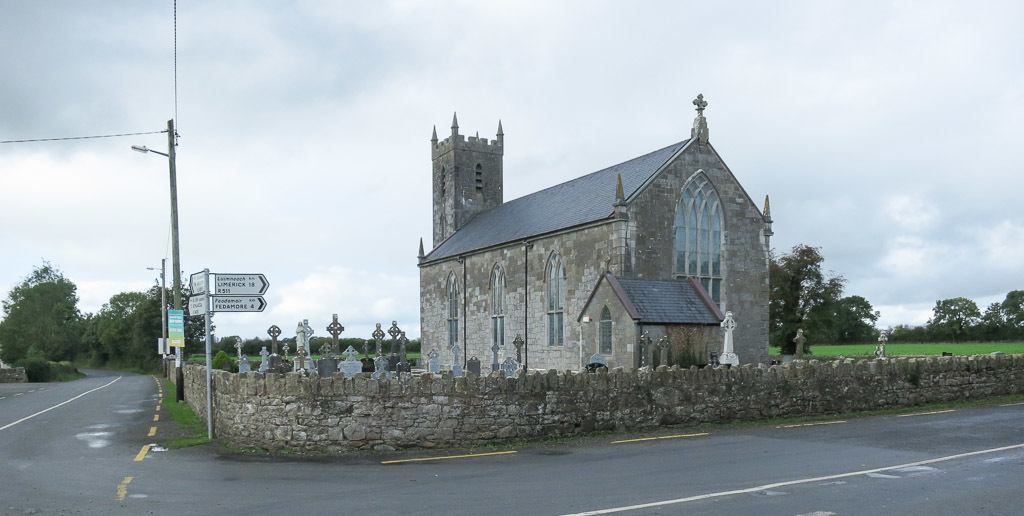
- Church in Meanus

- Location in Ireland
- Coordinates: 52°30′38″N 08°36′27″W
- Country: Ireland
- Province: Munster
- County: County Limerick
- Time zone: UTC+0 (WET)
  - Summer (DST): UTC-1 (IST (WEST))

Meanus (Irish: Méanas) is a small village and townland in County Limerick, Ireland, approximately 19km south of Limerick City. As of the 2011 census, the townland of Meanus had a population of 63 people.

The village has a Catholic church, a GAA club (Camogue Rovers GAA), soccer club (Meanus FC), one pub and a community centre. The Catholic church, Saint Mary's Roman Catholic Church, was built between 1845 and 1846, and was renovated in 1999.

The River Camogue runs close to the village. Nearby villages include Fedamore, Bruff, Athlacca, Croom, and Crecora.
