= 1985 Louth County Council election =

Part of the 1985 Irish local elections

← 1979	20 June 1985	1991 →

All 26 seats on Louth County Council
	First party	Second party	Third party
Party	Fianna Fáil	Fine Gael	Labour
Seats won	12	8	2
Seat change	0	0	0
	Fourth party	Fifth party
Party	Sinn Féin	Independent
Seats won	1	3
Seat change	0	0
- Map showing the area of Louth County Council
Council control after election
TBD

An election to Louth County Council took place on 20 June 1985 as part of that year's Irish local elections. 26 councillors were elected from six local electoral areas (LEAs) for a five-year term of office on the electoral system of proportional representation by means of the single transferable vote (PR-STV). This term was extended for a further year, to 1991.

== Results by party ==
Party	Seats	±	First Pref. votes	FPv%	±%
Fianna Fáil	12	0			
Fine Gael	8	0			
Labour	2	0			
Sinn Féin	1	0			
Independent	3	0			
Totals	26	0			—

== Results by local electoral area ==
=== Ardee ===
Ardee: 5 seats
Party	Candidate	FPv%	Count							
Party	Candidate	FPv%	1	2	3	4	5	6	7	8
Fianna Fáil	Nicholas McCabe*		1,035	1,097	1,111	1,114	1,128	1,195		
Fine Gael	Bernard Markey*		985	1,079	1,240					
Independent	Hugh D. Conlon*		692	777	805	811	932	1,112	1,173	1,179
Fianna Fáil	John McConville		730	731	745	747	869	899	1,036	1,041
Fianna Fáil	Paddy Sharkey*		610	649	651	651	660	686		
Fine Gael	Thomas McGrory*		591	596	766	817	881	928	978	980
Fianna Fáil	Colm Keenan		587	656	661	662	674	726	963	972
Sinn Féin	Jackie McGahon		521	546	546	562	598			
Fine Gael	Daniel Woods		426	437						
Labour	Terry Butterly		425	455	473	475				
Independent	Val Kerr		259							
Labour	Sean Reilly		119							
Electorate: 10,697 Valid: 7,040 Spoilt: 80 Quota: 1,174 Turnout: 7,120 (66.56%)

=== Carlingford ===
Carlingford: 3 seats
Party	Candidate	FPv%	Count						
Party	Candidate	FPv%	1	2	3	4	5	6	7
Sinn Féin	Arthur Morgan		875	886	918	1,012	1,034	1,112	1,133
Fianna Fáil	Peter Savage*		786	873	991	1,305			
Independent	Miceal O'Donnell*		796	827	870	938	981	1,092	1,148
Fine Gael	Terry Brennan		668	767	775	805	814	1,302	
Fine Gael	Tommy Elmore*		654	718	744	766	770		
Fianna Fáil	Phil McArdle		469	515	580				
Fianna Fáil	John Mills		293	261	299				
Fine Gael	Thomas Mulholland		203						
Labour	Jackie Callan		70						
Electorate: 6,804 Valid: 4,896 Spoilt: 62 Quota: 1,225 Turnout: 4,958 (72.88%)

=== Drogheda Rural ===
Drogheda Rural: 4 seats
Party	Candidate	FPv%	Count						
Party	Candidate	FPv%	1	2	3	4	5	6	7
Labour	Michael Bell TD*		949	1,038					
Fianna Fáil	Jimmy Mulroy		801	812	822	865	1,092		
Fianna Fáil	Tommy Murphy		635	649	653	673	763	858	902
Fine Gael	Tommy Donegan		564	579	589	672	715	716	1,096
Fianna Fáil	Tomas O hEochaidh		519	526	537	559	646	676	707
Fianna Fáil	Ben Devine		485	491	497	506			
Fine Gael	Patrick Carr		374	387	399	519	542	543	
Fine Gael	Ray Dempsey		316	330	338				
Labour	Tom Moran		180						
Electorate: 8,999 Valid: 4,823 (53.59%) Quota: 965

=== Drogheda Urban ===
Drogheda Urban: 4 seats
Party	Candidate	FPv%	Count							
Party	Candidate	FPv%	1	2	3	4	5	6	7	8
Fianna Fáil	Frank Godfrey*		922	936	978	1,011	1,111	1,156	1,329	
Fianna Fáil	Aloysious Farrell*		730	733	759	769	794	821	1,151	1,205
Fine Gael	Fergus O'Dowd*		730	738	801	833	870	1,182		
Fianna Fáil	Finian Brannigan		632	637	670	695	739	762		
Fianna Fáil	Con O'Brien		619	625	652	688	755	792	894	943
Labour	Peter Moore		597	612	632	839	898	951	1,004	1,021
Fine Gael	Paddy Buckley*		472	476	498	520	535			
Sinn Féin	Hugh McShane		411	428	440	456				
Labour	Peter Hughes		374	386	402					
Independent	Tom Burke		274	279						
Workers' Party	John McKenna		103							
Electorate: 10,090 Valid: 5,864 (58.12%) Quota: 1,173

=== Dundalk Rural ===
Dundalk Rural: 5 seats
Party	Candidate	FPv%	Count						
Party	Candidate	FPv%	1	2	3	4	5	6	7
Fianna Fáil	Eddie Filgate*		1,473						
Fine Gael	Sen. Joseph Lennon*		1,297						
Fianna Fáil	Dermot Ahern*		1,078	1,182	1,186	1,198			
Sinn Féin	Frank Duffy		880	891	894	921	957	1,004	1,047
Fine Gael	John McGuinness*		746	760	806	824	924	1,399	
Fianna Fáil	Joe Farrell*		643	767	775	786	836	924	1,059
Fine Gael	Martin Brennan		581	595	632	641	752		
Labour	Frank Carney		318	327	331	376			
Workers' Party	Pat Rooney		146	149	150				
Electorate: 12,620 Valid: 7,162 Spoilt: 175 Quota: 1,194 Turnout: 7,337 (58.14%)

=== Dundalk Urban ===
Dundalk Urban: 5 seats
Party	Candidate	FPv%	Count							
Party	Candidate	FPv%	1	2	3	4	5	6	7	8
Fianna Fáil	Thomas Bellew*		1,358							
Fine Gael	Brendan McGahon TD*		1,305							
Sinn Féin	Fra Browne*		1,114	1,139	1,153					
Fianna Fáil	Seamus Keelan		604	689	692	700	711	826	859	1,038
Independent	Neil McCann		583	592	609	654	692	719	807	1,013
Fianna Fáil	Pearse O'Hanrahan		563	599	608	615	632	740	776	874
Independent	Martin Bellew*		508	522	534	568	603	629	752	
Fine Gael	Joe Gallagher		299	305	391	403	429	436		
Fianna Fáil	Eamon Kinch		266	295	299	303	308			
Labour	Frank Corrigan		130	134	138	161				
Workers' Party	Tim Morgan		126	126	131					
Green Alliance	Fiona Murphy		40	40	41					
Electorate: 12,330 Valid: 6,896 Spoilt: 223 Quota: 1,150 Turnout: 7,119 (57.74%)
