= Séamus Kirk =

Irish former politician (born 1945)

Ceann Comhairle of Dáil Éireann
- In office 13 October 2009 – 9 March 2011
- Deputy: Brendan Howlin
- Preceded by: John O'Donoghue
- Succeeded by: Seán Barrett

Minister of State
- 1987–1992: Agriculture and Food

Teachta Dála
- In office November 1982 – February 2016
- Constituency: Louth

Personal details
- Born: 26 April 1945 (age 81) Drumkeith, County Louth, Ireland
- Party: Fianna Fáil
- Spouse: Mary McGeough
- Children: 4
- Education: University College Galway

Séamus Kirk (born 26 April 1945) is an Irish former Fianna Fáil politician who served as Ceann Comhairle of Dáil Éireann from 2009 to 2011 and a Minister of State from 1987 to 1992. He served as a Teachta Dála (TD) for the Louth constituency from 1982 to 2016.

== Background ==
Kirk was born in Drumkeith, County Louth. He is married to Mary McGeough. They have three sons and one daughter and live in Knockbridge, County Louth. He was educated at CBS Dundalk. He was a farmer and agricultural adviser before entering politics. He is a former footballer who played for the Louth county team.

== Political career ==
He was a member of Louth County Council from 1974 to 1985, and he was first elected to Dáil Éireann at the November 1982 general election as a member of the 24th Dáil, succeeding Eddie Filgate who had announced his resignation from national politics. He was returned in each subsequent election until his retirement.

Kirk was appointed Minister of State at the Department of Agriculture and Food from 1987 to 1992. and became Ireland's first Minister for Horticulture. During this time he helped establish Bord Glas in 1990 to attempt to expand the development of Ireland's fruit and vegetable sector. He served as Chairman of the Fianna Fáil parliamentary party from 2002 until October 2009 and was a long-serving member of the British-Irish Parliamentary Body. At the 2004 European Parliament election, he unsuccessfully contested the East constituency where Liam Aylward took a seat for Fianna Fáil.

On 13 October 2009, Kirk succeeded John O'Donoghue as Ceann Comhairle after O'Donoghue resigned over an expenses scandal. He was nominated for that post by Taoiseach Brian Cowen and seconded by Tanáiste Mary Coughlan, and he defeated Fine Gael's Dinny McGinley by 87 votes to 51 votes. McGinley had been nominated by his party's leader, Enda Kenny. In doing so he became the second Louth based Fianna Fáil TD to hold the office since Pádraig Faulkner.

In September 2014, he announced he would not be contesting the 2016 general election. The party's seat was retained by Declan Breathnach on that occasion, also a resident of the Knockbridge townland.

Kirk has been a life-long member of the GAA in Louth being a member of The Brides in his native Knockbridge and previously serving on the Louth GAA Committee that helped fund and develop the Darver Project for a training pitch for all teams in County Louth. He has been a life-long supporter of Knockbridge Tidy Towns and of the Dundalk & District Old IRA, a commemorative organisation who recognise the service of those who took part in the Easter Rising, The War of Independence and the Civil War. He also serves on Fianna Fáil committees at this commemorative level.

== Sporting Achievements ==
- O'Byrne Cup: 1963
- Leinster Junior Football Championship: 1966
- Cardinal O'Donnell Cup: 1968
- Louth Junior Football Championship: 1967
- Ranafast Cup: 1964

Political offices
Preceded by Patrick Hegarty; Paul Connaughton Snr	Minister of State at the Department of Agriculture and Food; 1987–1992; With: Joe Walsh	Succeeded by John Browne; Liam Hyland
Preceded by John O'Donoghue	Ceann Comhairle of Dáil Éireann; 2009–2011	Succeeded by Seán Barrett
Party political offices
Preceded by Rory O'Hanlon	Chair of the Fianna Fáil parliamentary party 2002–2009	Succeeded by John Browne

Dáil	Election	Deputy (Party)	Deputy (Party)	Deputy (Party)	Deputy (Party)	Deputy (Party)
4th	1923	Frank Aiken (Rep)	Peter Hughes (CnaG)	James Murphy (CnaG)	3 seats until 1977	
5th	1927 (Jun)	Frank Aiken (FF)	James Coburn (NL)	James Murphy (CnaG)	3 seats until 1977	
6th	1927 (Sep)	Frank Aiken (FF)	James Coburn (NL)	James Murphy (CnaG)	3 seats until 1977	
7th	1932	Frank Aiken (FF)	James Coburn (Ind.)	James Murphy (CnaG)	3 seats until 1977	
8th	1933	Frank Aiken (FF)	James Coburn (Ind.)	James Murphy (CnaG)	3 seats until 1977	
9th	1937	Frank Aiken (FF)	James Coburn (FG)	Laurence Walsh (FF)	3 seats until 1977	
10th	1938	Frank Aiken (FF)	James Coburn (FG)	Laurence Walsh (FF)	3 seats until 1977	
11th	1943	Frank Aiken (FF)	James Coburn (FG)	Roddy Connolly (Lab)	3 seats until 1977	
12th	1944	Frank Aiken (FF)	James Coburn (FG)	Laurence Walsh (FF)	3 seats until 1977	
13th	1948	Frank Aiken (FF)	James Coburn (FG)	Roddy Connolly (Lab)	3 seats until 1977	
14th	1951	Frank Aiken (FF)	James Coburn (FG)	Laurence Walsh (FF)	3 seats until 1977	
14th	1954 by-election	Frank Aiken (FF)	George Coburn (FG)	Laurence Walsh (FF)	3 seats until 1977	
15th	1954	Frank Aiken (FF)	George Coburn (FG)	Paddy Donegan (FG)	3 seats until 1977	
16th	1957	Frank Aiken (FF)	George Coburn (FG)	Pádraig Faulkner (Note: Faulker served as Ceann Comhairle in the 21st Dáil from 1977 to 1981, and was returned automatically at the 1981 election.) (FF)	3 seats until 1977	
17th	1961	Frank Aiken (FF)	Paddy Donegan (FG)	Pádraig Faulkner (FF)	3 seats until 1977	
18th	1965	Frank Aiken (FF)	Paddy Donegan (FG)	Pádraig Faulkner (FF)	3 seats until 1977	
19th	1969	Frank Aiken (FF)	Paddy Donegan (FG)	Pádraig Faulkner (FF)	3 seats until 1977	
20th	1973	Joseph Farrell (FF)	Paddy Donegan (FG)	Pádraig Faulkner (FF)	3 seats until 1977	
21st	1977	Joseph Farrell (FF)	Paddy Donegan (FG)	Pádraig Faulkner (FF)	Eddie Filgate (FF)	4 seats 1977–2011
22nd	1981	Paddy Agnew (AHB)	Bernard Markey (FG)	Pádraig Faulkner (FF)	Eddie Filgate (FF)	4 seats 1977–2011
23rd	1982 (Feb)	Thomas Bellew (FF)	Bernard Markey (FG)	Pádraig Faulkner (FF)	Eddie Filgate (FF)	4 seats 1977–2011
24th	1982 (Nov)	Michael Bell (Lab)	Brendan McGahon (FG)	Pádraig Faulkner (FF)	Séamus Kirk (Note: Kirk served as Ceann Comhairle in the 30th Dáil from 2009 to 2011, and was returned automatically at the 2011 election.) (FF)	4 seats 1977–2011
25th	1987	Michael Bell (Lab)	Brendan McGahon (FG)	Dermot Ahern (FF)	Séamus Kirk (FF)	4 seats 1977–2011
26th	1989	Michael Bell (Lab)	Brendan McGahon (FG)	Dermot Ahern (FF)	Séamus Kirk (FF)	4 seats 1977–2011
27th	1992	Michael Bell (Lab)	Brendan McGahon (FG)	Dermot Ahern (FF)	Séamus Kirk (FF)	4 seats 1977–2011
28th	1997	Michael Bell (Lab)	Brendan McGahon (FG)	Dermot Ahern (FF)	Séamus Kirk (FF)	4 seats 1977–2011
29th	2002	Arthur Morgan (SF)	Fergus O'Dowd (FG)	Dermot Ahern (FF)	Séamus Kirk (FF)	4 seats 1977–2011
30th	2007	Arthur Morgan (SF)	Fergus O'Dowd (FG)	Dermot Ahern (FF)	Séamus Kirk (FF)	4 seats 1977–2011
31st	2011	Gerry Adams (SF)	Fergus O'Dowd (FG)	Ged Nash (Lab)	Séamus Kirk (FF)	Peter Fitzpatrick (FG)
32nd	2016	Gerry Adams (SF)	Fergus O'Dowd (FG)	Declan Breathnach (FF)	Imelda Munster (SF)	Peter Fitzpatrick (FG)
33rd	2020	Ruairí Ó Murchú (SF)	Fergus O'Dowd (FG)	Ged Nash (Lab)	Imelda Munster (SF)	Peter Fitzpatrick (Ind.)
34th	2024	Ruairí Ó Murchú (SF)	Paula Butterly (FG)	Ged Nash (Lab)	Joanna Byrne (SF)	Erin McGreehan (FF)
