= Brendan McGahon =

Irish politician (1936–2017)

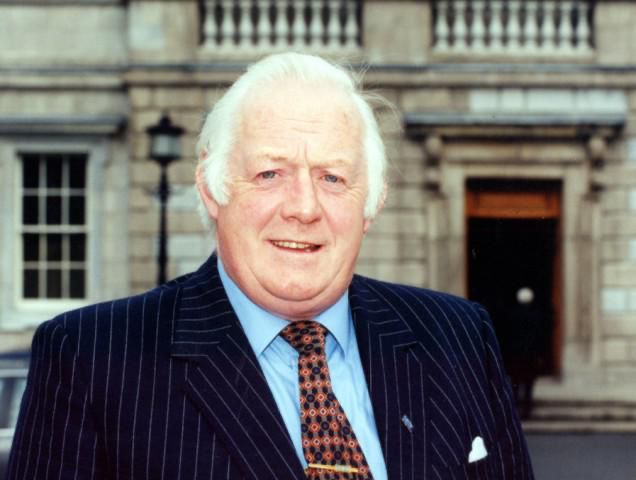

Teachta Dála
- In office November 1982 – May 2002
- Constituency: Louth

Personal details
- Born: 22 November 1936 Dundalk, County Louth, Ireland
- Died: 8 February 2017 (aged 80) Ravensdale, County Louth, Ireland
- Party: Fine Gael
- Spouse: Celine Lundy (m. 1970; died 2011)
- Children: 5
- Relatives: John McGahon (nephew)

Brendan McGahon (22 November 1936 – 8 February 2017) was an Irish Fine Gael politician who served as a Teachta Dála (TD) for the Louth constituency from 1982 to 2002.

Often described as 'colourful', with a reputation as a social conservative, McGahon was first elected to Dáil Éireann at the November 1982 general election and retained his seat until retiring at the 2002 general election.

== Early life ==
McGahon was born in Dundalk, County Louth, and was educated at St. Mary's College in Dundalk. His grandfather, T.F. McGahon, was one of the inaugural members of Dundalk Urban District Council when it was created along with other Irish local authorities by the British Government in 1898. T.F. McGahon was a leading member of the Irish Parliamentary Party (IPP). He started a local newspaper, the Dundalk Democrat which was supportive of the IPP. T.F. was a critic of the War of Independence campaign, of Sinn Féin, and of the then IRA, arguing that the campaign would result in the partition of Ireland. He was later succeeded on the council by his son, O.B. McGahon who in turn was followed by his nephew, Hugh McGahon. The family subsequently supported the National League Party and the Independent TD James Coburn and joined Fine Gael when Coburn joined the party. They were also prominent members of the Ancient Order of Hibernians.

Brendan married Celine Lundy, a widow from Newry, County Down, and took over the running of the family newspaper business in the 1960s. He played soccer for Dundalk F.C. in the Premier Division for a number of years.

== Political career ==
McGahon succeeded his cousin Hugh, on Dundalk Town Council and on Louth County Council at the 1979 local elections. McGahon was an unsuccessful candidate at the 1981 general election and at the February 1982 general election. He was first elected to Dáil Éireann for Louth at the November 1982 general election, defeating incumbent Fine Gael TD, Bernard Markey. He was re-elected at the next five general elections.

A notable aspect of his political career was his stand against the Provisional IRA when that organisation's campaign of violence was at its height.He refused to close his newsagents shop in Dundalk during the funerals of the hunger strikers in 1981. He took another huge risk a few years later when he gave evidence in the High Court is support of the Sunday Times, which was being sued for libel by Thomas Murphy for accusing him of directing an IRA bombing campaign in Britain. Local gardaí were ordered not to get involved in that case but McGahon was not deterred from giving evidence that helped the newspaper to defend the claims being made against it by Murphy.

A maverick and outspoken TD he was known to speak his mind on many issues including divorce, crime, and single mothers. He once advocated that paedophiles should be castrated as part of their prison sentence and was the only TD to oppose the referendum to abolish the death penalty from the Constitution. He also argued that those aged under 21 years of age should not be able to drive or drink, he was a member of the World anti-Communist League and opposed the decriminalisation of homosexuality. In 1993, he was the only TD to oppose the decriminalisation of homosexuality and said in the Dail that:

"I regard homosexuals as being in a sad category, but I believe homosexuality to be an abnormality, some type of psycho-sexual problem that has defied explanation over the years. I do not believe that the Irish people desire this normalisation of what is clearly an abnormality. Homosexuality is a departure from normality and while homosexuals deserve our compassion they do not deserve our tolerance. That is how the man in the street thinks. I know of no homosexual who has been discriminated against. Such people have a persecution complex because they know they are different from the masses or normal society. They endure inner torment and it is not a question of the way others view them. The lord provided us with sexual organs for a specific purpose. Homosexuals are like left-hand drivers driving on the right-hand side of the road."

On the other hand, he spoke out strongly against the influence of the drink industry and defied his own party whip to vote with his left-wing friend Tony Gregory in favour of banning of hare-coursing. He was also on good personal terms with members of the Oireachtas such as Michael D. Higgins and David Norris despite holding fundamentally opposed views to them.

He did not contest the 2002 general election and retired from politics.

== Personal life ==
McGahon lived in Ravensdale, County Louth. His son Conor was a Louth County Councillor from 1991 to 1999 and his brother Johnny was a Louth County Councillor from 1995 to 2004. Johnny's nephew John McGahon was elected to Louth County Council at the 2014 local elections and to Seanad Éireann in 2020.

Dáil	Election	Deputy (Party)	Deputy (Party)	Deputy (Party)	Deputy (Party)	Deputy (Party)
4th	1923	Frank Aiken (Rep)	Peter Hughes (CnaG)	James Murphy (CnaG)	3 seats until 1977	
5th	1927 (Jun)	Frank Aiken (FF)	James Coburn (NL)	James Murphy (CnaG)	3 seats until 1977	
6th	1927 (Sep)	Frank Aiken (FF)	James Coburn (NL)	James Murphy (CnaG)	3 seats until 1977	
7th	1932	Frank Aiken (FF)	James Coburn (Ind.)	James Murphy (CnaG)	3 seats until 1977	
8th	1933	Frank Aiken (FF)	James Coburn (Ind.)	James Murphy (CnaG)	3 seats until 1977	
9th	1937	Frank Aiken (FF)	James Coburn (FG)	Laurence Walsh (FF)	3 seats until 1977	
10th	1938	Frank Aiken (FF)	James Coburn (FG)	Laurence Walsh (FF)	3 seats until 1977	
11th	1943	Frank Aiken (FF)	James Coburn (FG)	Roddy Connolly (Lab)	3 seats until 1977	
12th	1944	Frank Aiken (FF)	James Coburn (FG)	Laurence Walsh (FF)	3 seats until 1977	
13th	1948	Frank Aiken (FF)	James Coburn (FG)	Roddy Connolly (Lab)	3 seats until 1977	
14th	1951	Frank Aiken (FF)	James Coburn (FG)	Laurence Walsh (FF)	3 seats until 1977	
14th	1954 by-election	Frank Aiken (FF)	George Coburn (FG)	Laurence Walsh (FF)	3 seats until 1977	
15th	1954	Frank Aiken (FF)	George Coburn (FG)	Paddy Donegan (FG)	3 seats until 1977	
16th	1957	Frank Aiken (FF)	George Coburn (FG)	Pádraig Faulkner (Note: Faulker served as Ceann Comhairle in the 21st Dáil from 1977 to 1981, and was returned automatically at the 1981 election.) (FF)	3 seats until 1977	
17th	1961	Frank Aiken (FF)	Paddy Donegan (FG)	Pádraig Faulkner (FF)	3 seats until 1977	
18th	1965	Frank Aiken (FF)	Paddy Donegan (FG)	Pádraig Faulkner (FF)	3 seats until 1977	
19th	1969	Frank Aiken (FF)	Paddy Donegan (FG)	Pádraig Faulkner (FF)	3 seats until 1977	
20th	1973	Joseph Farrell (FF)	Paddy Donegan (FG)	Pádraig Faulkner (FF)	3 seats until 1977	
21st	1977	Joseph Farrell (FF)	Paddy Donegan (FG)	Pádraig Faulkner (FF)	Eddie Filgate (FF)	4 seats 1977–2011
22nd	1981	Paddy Agnew (AHB)	Bernard Markey (FG)	Pádraig Faulkner (FF)	Eddie Filgate (FF)	4 seats 1977–2011
23rd	1982 (Feb)	Thomas Bellew (FF)	Bernard Markey (FG)	Pádraig Faulkner (FF)	Eddie Filgate (FF)	4 seats 1977–2011
24th	1982 (Nov)	Michael Bell (Lab)	Brendan McGahon (FG)	Pádraig Faulkner (FF)	Séamus Kirk (Note: Kirk served as Ceann Comhairle in the 30th Dáil from 2009 to 2011, and was returned automatically at the 2011 election.) (FF)	4 seats 1977–2011
25th	1987	Michael Bell (Lab)	Brendan McGahon (FG)	Dermot Ahern (FF)	Séamus Kirk (FF)	4 seats 1977–2011
26th	1989	Michael Bell (Lab)	Brendan McGahon (FG)	Dermot Ahern (FF)	Séamus Kirk (FF)	4 seats 1977–2011
27th	1992	Michael Bell (Lab)	Brendan McGahon (FG)	Dermot Ahern (FF)	Séamus Kirk (FF)	4 seats 1977–2011
28th	1997	Michael Bell (Lab)	Brendan McGahon (FG)	Dermot Ahern (FF)	Séamus Kirk (FF)	4 seats 1977–2011
29th	2002	Arthur Morgan (SF)	Fergus O'Dowd (FG)	Dermot Ahern (FF)	Séamus Kirk (FF)	4 seats 1977–2011
30th	2007	Arthur Morgan (SF)	Fergus O'Dowd (FG)	Dermot Ahern (FF)	Séamus Kirk (FF)	4 seats 1977–2011
31st	2011	Gerry Adams (SF)	Fergus O'Dowd (FG)	Ged Nash (Lab)	Séamus Kirk (FF)	Peter Fitzpatrick (FG)
32nd	2016	Gerry Adams (SF)	Fergus O'Dowd (FG)	Declan Breathnach (FF)	Imelda Munster (SF)	Peter Fitzpatrick (FG)
33rd	2020	Ruairí Ó Murchú (SF)	Fergus O'Dowd (FG)	Ged Nash (Lab)	Imelda Munster (SF)	Peter Fitzpatrick (Ind.)
34th	2024	Ruairí Ó Murchú (SF)	Paula Butterly (FG)	Ged Nash (Lab)	Joanna Byrne (SF)	Erin McGreehan (FF)
