= Louth (Dáil constituency) =

Dáil constituency (1923–present)

- Dáil constituency
- Location of Louth within Ireland
- Interactive map of constituency boundaries since the 2024 general election
- Major settlements: Ardee; Dundalk; Drogheda

Current constituency
- Created: 1923
- Seats: 3 (1923–1977); 4 (1977–2011); 5 (2011–)
- TDs: Paula Butterly (FG); Joanna Byrne (SF); Erin McGreehan (FF); Ged Nash (Lab); Ruairí Ó Murchú (SF)
- Local government areas: County Louth; County Meath
- Created from: Louth–Meath
- EP constituency: Midlands–North-West

Louth is a parliamentary constituency represented in Dáil Éireann, the lower house of the Irish parliament or Oireachtas. The constituency elects five deputies (Teachtaí Dála, commonly known as TDs) on the system of proportional representation by means of the single transferable vote (PR-STV). It covers the entirety of County Louth and a small area of County Meath.

== Boundaries ==
The constituency was created by the Electoral Act 1923, and first used at the 1923 general election. It currently spans the entire area of County Louth (which includes the towns of Ardee, Dundalk, Drogheda), the smallest county in Ireland, and a part of County Meath including the suburbs of Drogheda.

The Electoral (Amendment) Act 2023 defines the constituency as:

"The county of Louth;

and, in the county of Meath, the electoral division of:

St. Mary's (part), in the former Rural District of Meath."

Changes to the Louth constituency
Years	TDs	Boundaries	Notes
1923–1961	3	County Louth.	Created from Louth–Meath
1961–1977	3	County Louth, except the part in the constituency of Monaghan.	Transfer to Monaghan of the DEDs of Barronstown, Castlering, Creggan Upper, Killanny, in the former Rural District of Dundalk; Ardee Urban, Clonkeen, Tallanstown, and the townlands of: Artnalevery, Ballybailie, Ballygowan, Bogtown, Boharnamoe, Cappocksgreen, Charlestown, Cookstown, Coole, Dowds-town, Glebe, Greenlane, Gudderstown, Harristown (part of, north of the river Dee), Irishtown, Knockcurlan, Knock-lore, Lambtown, Lisrenny, Manistown, Mapastown, Mullacloe, Mullanstown, Pepperstown, Philbenstown, Rahanna, Riverstown, Rock, Scogganstown, Streamstown and Townparks in the district electoral division of Ardee Rural in the former Rural District of Ardee No. 1.
1977–1981	4	County Louth; and in County Monaghan, the district electoral divisions of Drumboory, Inishkeen, Kiltybegs, in the former Rural District of Carrickmacross.	
1981–2011	4	County Louth.	
2011–2024	5	County Louth; and in County Meath, the electoral divisions of Julianstown, St. Mary's (part), in the former Rural District of Meath.	Transfer of territory from Meath East
2024–	5	County Louth; and in County Meath, the electoral division of St. Mary's (part), in the former Rural District of Meath.	Transfer of Julianstown to Meath East

== TDs ==
Teachtaí Dála (TDs) for Louth 1923–
Key to parties: AHB = Anti H-Block; CnaG = Cumann na nGaedheal; FF = Fianna Fáil; FG = Fine Gael; Ind. = Independent; Lab = Labour; NL = National League; Rep = Republican; SF = Sinn Féin
Dáil	Election	Deputy (Party)	Deputy (Party)	Deputy (Party)	Deputy (Party)	Deputy (Party)
4th	1923	Frank Aiken (Rep)	Peter Hughes (CnaG)	James Murphy (CnaG)	3 seats until 1977	
5th	1927 (Jun)	Frank Aiken (FF)	James Coburn (NL)	James Murphy (CnaG)	3 seats until 1977	
6th	1927 (Sep)	Frank Aiken (FF)	James Coburn (NL)	James Murphy (CnaG)	3 seats until 1977	
7th	1932	Frank Aiken (FF)	James Coburn (Ind.)	James Murphy (CnaG)	3 seats until 1977	
8th	1933	Frank Aiken (FF)	James Coburn (Ind.)	James Murphy (CnaG)	3 seats until 1977	
9th	1937	Frank Aiken (FF)	James Coburn (FG)	Laurence Walsh (FF)	3 seats until 1977	
10th	1938	Frank Aiken (FF)	James Coburn (FG)	Laurence Walsh (FF)	3 seats until 1977	
11th	1943	Frank Aiken (FF)	James Coburn (FG)	Roddy Connolly (Lab)	3 seats until 1977	
12th	1944	Frank Aiken (FF)	James Coburn (FG)	Laurence Walsh (FF)	3 seats until 1977	
13th	1948	Frank Aiken (FF)	James Coburn (FG)	Roddy Connolly (Lab)	3 seats until 1977	
14th	1951	Frank Aiken (FF)	James Coburn (FG)	Laurence Walsh (FF)	3 seats until 1977	
14th	1954 by-election	Frank Aiken (FF)	George Coburn (FG)	Laurence Walsh (FF)	3 seats until 1977	
15th	1954	Frank Aiken (FF)	George Coburn (FG)	Paddy Donegan (FG)	3 seats until 1977	
16th	1957	Frank Aiken (FF)	George Coburn (FG)	Pádraig Faulkner (Note: Faulker served as Ceann Comhairle in the 21st Dáil from 1977 to 1981, and was returned automatically at the 1981 election.) (FF)	3 seats until 1977	
17th	1961	Frank Aiken (FF)	Paddy Donegan (FG)	Pádraig Faulkner (FF)	3 seats until 1977	
18th	1965	Frank Aiken (FF)	Paddy Donegan (FG)	Pádraig Faulkner (FF)	3 seats until 1977	
19th	1969	Frank Aiken (FF)	Paddy Donegan (FG)	Pádraig Faulkner (FF)	3 seats until 1977	
20th	1973	Joseph Farrell (FF)	Paddy Donegan (FG)	Pádraig Faulkner (FF)	3 seats until 1977	
21st	1977	Joseph Farrell (FF)	Paddy Donegan (FG)	Pádraig Faulkner (FF)	Eddie Filgate (FF)	4 seats 1977–2011
22nd	1981	Paddy Agnew (AHB)	Bernard Markey (FG)	Pádraig Faulkner (FF)	Eddie Filgate (FF)	4 seats 1977–2011
23rd	1982 (Feb)	Thomas Bellew (FF)	Bernard Markey (FG)	Pádraig Faulkner (FF)	Eddie Filgate (FF)	4 seats 1977–2011
24th	1982 (Nov)	Michael Bell (Lab)	Brendan McGahon (FG)	Pádraig Faulkner (FF)	Séamus Kirk (Note: Kirk served as Ceann Comhairle in the 30th Dáil from 2009 to 2011, and was returned automatically at the 2011 election.) (FF)	4 seats 1977–2011
25th	1987	Michael Bell (Lab)	Brendan McGahon (FG)	Dermot Ahern (FF)	Séamus Kirk (FF)	4 seats 1977–2011
26th	1989	Michael Bell (Lab)	Brendan McGahon (FG)	Dermot Ahern (FF)	Séamus Kirk (FF)	4 seats 1977–2011
27th	1992	Michael Bell (Lab)	Brendan McGahon (FG)	Dermot Ahern (FF)	Séamus Kirk (FF)	4 seats 1977–2011
28th	1997	Michael Bell (Lab)	Brendan McGahon (FG)	Dermot Ahern (FF)	Séamus Kirk (FF)	4 seats 1977–2011
29th	2002	Arthur Morgan (SF)	Fergus O'Dowd (FG)	Dermot Ahern (FF)	Séamus Kirk (FF)	4 seats 1977–2011
30th	2007	Arthur Morgan (SF)	Fergus O'Dowd (FG)	Dermot Ahern (FF)	Séamus Kirk (FF)	4 seats 1977–2011
31st	2011	Gerry Adams (SF)	Fergus O'Dowd (FG)	Ged Nash (Lab)	Séamus Kirk (FF)	Peter Fitzpatrick (FG)
32nd	2016	Gerry Adams (SF)	Fergus O'Dowd (FG)	Declan Breathnach (FF)	Imelda Munster (SF)	Peter Fitzpatrick (FG)
33rd	2020	Ruairí Ó Murchú (SF)	Fergus O'Dowd (FG)	Ged Nash (Lab)	Imelda Munster (SF)	Peter Fitzpatrick (Ind.)
34th	2024	Ruairí Ó Murchú (SF)	Paula Butterly (FG)	Ged Nash (Lab)	Joanna Byrne (SF)	Erin McGreehan (FF)

Note: The columns in this table are used only for presentational purposes, and no significance should be attached to the order of columns. For details of the order in which seats were won at each election, see the detailed results of that election.

== Electoral division ==
Louth population as per electoral division, for the Dáil constituency of Louth. This population count includes those within the county of Louth, as well as the electoral divisions of Julianstown, and St. Mary's (part) in the county of Meath, as per the Electoral (Amendment) (Dáil Constituencies) Act 2017.

Electoral Division	Population – 2006	Population – 2011	Population – 2016
Louth	128600	143272	150481
Dundalk (Town + Rural), County Louth	51758	56761	59557
Dundalk Town, County Louth	29037	31149	32288
004 Dundalk Urban No. 1, County Louth	2190	2148	2169
005 Dundalk Urban No. 2, County Louth	1211	1169	1140
006 Dundalk Urban No. 3, County Louth	1400	1449	1710
007 Dundalk Urban No. 4, County Louth	6183	6039	5970
023 Castletown (Part Urban), County Louth	2518	2637	2685
027 Dundalk Rural (Part Urban), County Louth	15440	17620	18514
030 Haggardstown (Part Urban), County Louth	95	87	100
Dundalk rural area, County Louth	22721	25612	27269
019 Ballymascanlan, County Louth	2016	2213	2206
020 Barronstown, County Louth	647	744	746
021 Carlingford, County Louth	1384	1801	2201
022 Castlering, County Louth	935	1012	1034
023 Castletown (Part Rural), County Louth	1421	1573	1622
024 Creggan Upper, County Louth	684	787	852
025 Darver, County Louth	562	568	678
026 Drummullagh, County Louth	1120	1257	1350
027 Dundalk Rural (Part Rural), County Louth	535	540	686
028 Faughart, County Louth	905	991	958
029 Greenore, County Louth	979	1169	1201
030 Haggardstown (Part Rural), County Louth	5769	6303	6819
031 Jenkinstown, County Louth	948	1173	1277
032 Killanny, County Louth	683	799	825
033 Louth, County Louth	1308	1505	1575
034 Mansfieldstown, County Louth	640	807	855
035 Rathcor, County Louth	1203	1352	1374
036 Ravensdale, County Louth	982	1018	1010
Drogheda (Town + Rural), County Louth & County Meath	46306	48951	51577
001 Fair Gate, County Louth	9783	9806	10317
002 St. Laurence Gate, County Louth	3801	4004	4075
003 West Gate, County Louth	5899	6042	6284
041 St. Peter's (Part Urban), County Louth	3460	2161	2099
047 St. Mary's (Part Urban), County Louth	6030	6563	6696
045 Julianstown, County Meath	8289	9606	10139
047 St. Mary's (Part Rural), County Meath	9044	10769	11967
Ardee No. 1 rural area, County Louth	17976	20262	20924
008 Ardee Rural, County Louth	2626	2875	2952
009 Ardee Urban, County Louth	4301	4554	4917
010 Castlebellingham, County Louth	1371	1617	1688
011 Clonkeen, County Louth	545	648	675
012 Collon, County Louth	1380	1770	1859
013 Dromin, County Louth	535	610	629
014 Dromiskin, County Louth	1935	2187	2226
015 Drumcar, County Louth	1385	1526	1451
016 Dunleer, County Louth	2340	2796	2868
017 Stabannan, County Louth	590	620	619
018 Tallanstown, County Louth	968	1059	1040
Louth rural area, County Louth	12560	17298	18423
037 Clogher, County Louth	2494	3031	3237
038 Dysart, County Louth	777	918	925
039 Monasterboice, County Louth	1164	1342	1365
040 Mullary, County Louth	1528	1723	1754
041 St. Peter's (Part Rural), County Louth	4022	6990	7605
042 Termonfeckin, County Louth	2575	3294	3537

== Elections ==
*: Outgoing TD

=== 2024 general election ===
2024 general election: Louth
Party	Candidate	FPv%	Count																			
Party	Candidate	FPv%	1	2	3	4	5	6	7	8	9	10	11	12	13	14	15	16	17	18	19	20
Sinn Féin	Ruairí Ó Murchú	13.7	8,728	8,731	8,732	8,733	8,736	8,745	8,748	8,768	8,803	8,879	8,958	9,123	9,621	9,845	10,201	13,016				
Sinn Féin	Joanna Byrne	12.8	8,169	8,172	8,185	8,187	8,192	8,218	8,228	8,234	8,245	8,318	8,374	8,496	8,933	9,130	9,358	9,912	11,989			
Labour	Ged Nash	11.9	7,594	7,595	7,599	7,608	7,615	7,647	7,660	7,666	7,691	7,747	8,120	8,705	9,252	9,539	9,714	9,833	9,927	10,204	10,573	12,533
Fianna Fáil	Erin McGreehan	9.1	5,772	5,772	5,773	5,773	5,773	5,775	5,776	5,785	5,796	5,886	6,090	6,159	6,218	6,377	6,463	6,828	6,959	7,118	8,284	8,629
Fine Gael	Paula Butterly	8.9	5,646	5,648	5,652	5,653	5,656	5,658	5,662	5,666	5,675	5,886	6,091	6,167	6,206	6,299	6,359	6,418	6,433	6,460	8,502	9,062
Fianna Fáil	Alison Comyn	7.7	4,913	4,914	4,918	4,921	4,923	4,930	4,931	4,936	4,945	5,029	5,119	5,176	5,196	5,335	5,391	5,416	5,426	5,458	5,686	6,412
Fine Gael	John McGahon	6.3	4,021	4,022	4,024	4,024	4,027	4,029	4,031	4,037	4,051	4,111	4,194	4,231	4,274	4,336	4,440	4,513	4,545	4,587		
Sinn Féin	Antóin Watters	5.9	3,767	3,767	3,767	3,768	3,769	3,775	3,775	3,786	3,801	3,827	3,849	3,893	4,096	4,265	4,325					
Independent	Kevin Callan	5.1	3,223	3,231	3,268	3,273	3,276	3,295	3,305	3,320	3,339	3,604	3,676	3,770	3,883	4,181	5,197	5,258	5,292	5,500	5,682	
Irish Freedom	Hermann Kelly	4.0	2,546	2,549	2,552	2,575	2,612	2,612	2,635	2,695	2,731	2,829	2,842	2,856	2,907	3,608						
Aontú	Michael O'Dowd	3.7	2,330	2,331	2,334	2,336	2,359	2,367	2,392	2,410	2,452	2,519	2,540	2,581	2,657							
PBP–Solidarity	James Renaghan (Note: Renaghan is a member of People Before Profit.)	2.6	1,671	1,671	1,672	1,674	1,677	1,685	1,689	1,708	1,740	1,764	1,855	2,278								
Social Democrats	Niall McCreanor	2.4	1,547	1,548	1,550	1,551	1,555	1,560	1,560	1,563	1,580	1,614	1,783									
Green	Marianne Butler	2.4	1,504	1,505	1,506	1,506	1,506	1,506	1,509	1,512	1,515	1,560										
Independent	David Brennan	1.0	671	672	680	686	689	689	747	773	805											
Independent	Thomas Clare	0.6	416	419	426	432	435	442	451	468	482											
Independent Ireland	Ryan McKeown	0.5	305	306	308	309	319	322	324	354												
Independent	Tracy O'Hanlon	0.4	234	235	239	259	270	279	282													
Independent	David Bradley	0.2	157	158	161	171	176	182														
Independent	Peter-James Nugent	0.2	149	149	149	157	158															
The Irish People	Derek McElearney	0.2	119	121	121	133																
Independent	Alan Fagan	0.2	114	116	116																	
Independent	Albert Byrne	0.1	99	100																		
Independent	David Carroll	0.1	40																			
Electorate: 104,799 Valid: 63,735 Spoilt: 675 Quota: 10,623 Turnout: 61.5%

=== 2020 general election ===
2020 general election: Louth
Party	Candidate	FPv%	Count									
Party	Candidate	FPv%	1	2	3	4	5	6	7	8	9	10
Sinn Féin	Imelda Munster	24.3	17,203									
Sinn Féin	Ruairí Ó Murchú	17.7	12,491									
Fine Gael	Fergus O'Dowd	9.0	6,380	6,737	6,746	6,752	6,775	6,936	6,980	7,485	10,159	11,282
Independent	Peter Fitzpatrick	8.6	6,085	6,515	6,703	6,734	6,956	7,571	8,201	8,379	8,988	10,779
Labour	Ged Nash	8.2	5,824	6,889	6,918	6,926	6,973	7,190	7,545	8,389	8,638	11,659
Fianna Fáil	Declan Breathnach	8.2	5,781	5,919	5,958	5,975	6,023	6,124	6,178	8,403	8,771	9,625
Green	Mark Dearey	7.7	5,418	6,113	6,263	6,290	6,436	6,680	7,675	7,917	8,497	
Fine Gael	John McGahon	6.3	4,442	4,516	4,544	4,549	4,560	4,606	4,642	4,738		
Fianna Fáil	James Byrne	5.5	3,911	4,179	4,187	4,198	4,232	4,325	4,355			
Solidarity–PBP	Audrey Fergus (Note: Fergus was a member of People Before Profit.)	1.6	1,120	2,317	2,478	2,501	2,675	3,028				
Renua	Eamon Sweeney	1.1	794	1,067	1,083	1,092	1,163					
Irish Freedom	Cathal Ó Murchú	0.8	574	1,000	1,041	1,053	1,138					
Independent	Topanga Bird	0.3	243	474	500	538						
Independent	David Bradley	0.4	256	410	417	465						
Independent	Albert Byrne	0.2	145	262	273							
Electorate: 113,128 Valid: 70,667 Spoilt: 757 Quota: 11,778 Turnout: 71,424 (63.1%)

=== 2016 general election ===
2016 general election: Louth
Party	Candidate	FPv%	Count										
Party	Candidate	FPv%	1	2	3	4	5	6	7	8	9	10	11
Sinn Féin	Gerry Adams	15.8	10,661	10,774	10,826	10,908	11,096	11,278					
Fianna Fáil	Declan Breathnach	13.5	9,099	9,146	9,220	9,609	9,931	12,192					
Sinn Féin	Imelda Munster	13.1	8,829	9,061	9,103	9,224	9,356	9,563	9,712	9,995	10,992	13,029	
Fine Gael	Fergus O'Dowd	10.1	6,814	6,838	6,943	7,271	7,418	7,586	7,680	8,115	8,827	9,124	9,256
Fine Gael	Peter Fitzpatrick	9.5	6,408	6,417	6,591	6,693	6,969	7,113	7,206	7,977	8,231	8,931	9,132
Labour	Ged Nash	7.3	4,945	4,976	5,293	5,472	5,593	5,760	5,895	6,715	7,888	8,454	8,746
Independent	Kevin Callan	5.2	3,541	3,683	3,701	4,030	4,388	4,592	4,779	5,224			
AAA–PBP	Garrett Weldon	5.1	3,462	3,644	3,690	3,816	4,468	4,586	4,675	5,588	6,290		
Fianna Fáil	Emma Coffey	5.1	3,422	3,442	3,496	3,622	3,819						
Green	Mark Dearey	4.7	3,187	3,225	3,363	3,530	4,099	4,327	4,517				
Independent	Maeve Yore	4.1	2,746	2,814	2,953	3,138							
Renua	Michael O'Dowd	3.1	2,095	2,219	2,242								
Labour	Mary Moran	1.8	1,198	1,211									
Direct Democracy	Anthony Connor	1.0	676										
Independent	David Bradley	0.5	319										
Direct Democracy	Pat Greene	0.2	127										
Electorate: 104,696 Valid: 67,529 Spoilt: 749 Quota: 11,255 Turnout: 68,278 (65.2%)

=== 2011 general election ===
Séamus Kirk was Ceann Comhairle at the dissolution of the 30th Dáil and therefore deemed to be returned automatically. The constituency was treated as a four-seater for the purposes of calculating the quota.

2011 general election: Louth
Party	Candidate	FPv%	Count												
Party	Candidate	FPv%	1	2	3	4	5	6	7	8	9	10	11	12	13
Fianna Fáil	Séamus Kirk	N/A	Returned automatically												
Sinn Féin	Gerry Adams	21.7	15,072												
Fine Gael	Fergus O'Dowd	20.2	13,980												
Labour	Ged Nash	12.6	8,718	8,942	8,948	8,984	8,998	9,037	9,098	9,404	9,821	10,480	10,658	14,620	
Fine Gael	Peter Fitzpatrick	11.3	7,845	7,998	8,002	8,052	8,069	8,130	8,177	8,475	8,982	9,930	10,626	11,770	12,323
Fianna Fáil	James Carroll	8.2	5,681	5,749	5,751	5,759	5,774	5,792	5,803	5,987	6,481	6,769	10,711	11,185	11,388
Fianna Fáil	Declan Breathnach	7.5	5,177	5,245	5,245	5,247	5,263	5,285	5,297	5,373	5,603	6,001			
Labour	Mary Moran	6.6	4,546	4,738	4,742	4,747	4,748	4,808	4,908	5,124	5,436	6,430	6,974		
Green	Mark Dearey	4.7	3,244	3,358	3,362	3,366	3,374	3,421	3,506	3,672	3,939				
New Vision	Thomas Clare (Note: New Vision was an electoral alliance of independent non-party candidates and did not appear on the ballot.)	3.2	2,233	2,318	2,324	2,328	2,390	2,456	2,569	3,024					
Independent	Fred Matthews	1.4	957	1,004	1,013	1,015	1,024	1,089	1,207						
Independent	Frank Godfrey	0.8	649	714	727	731	754	781	829						
Independent	Robin Wilson	0.8	536	592	597	598	610	692							
Independent	Luke Martin	0.3	224	289	293	293	300								
Independent	Gerry Crilly	0.3	222	252	254	254	267								
Independent	David Bradley	0.3	174	211	215	215									
Independent	Robert Glynn	0.1	61	65											
Electorate: 99,530 Valid: 69,319 Spoilt: 871 (1.2%) Quota: 13,864 Turnout: 70,190 (70.5%)

=== 2007 general election ===
2007 general election: Louth
Party	Candidate	FPv%	Count					
Party	Candidate	FPv%	1	2	3	4	5	6
Fianna Fáil	Séamus Kirk	18.5	10,190	10,225	10,400	10,457	11,696	
Fianna Fáil	Dermot Ahern	18.1	9,982	10,020	10,375	10,500	11,321	
Fine Gael	Fergus O'Dowd	15.2	8,387	8,421	8,738	10,208	11,036	
Sinn Féin	Arthur Morgan	15.0	8,274	8,385	8,596	8,836	8,989	10,556
Fine Gael	Mairead McGuinness	9.5	5,199	5,228	6,240	6,503	6,550	8,847
Green	Mark Dearey	7.6	4,172	4,296	4,711	5,118	5,225	
Fianna Fáil	Frank Maher	5.5	3,009	3,031	3,045	3,287		
Labour	Ged Nash	5.0	2,739	2,786	2,856			
Fine Gael	Jim D'Arcy	4.7	2,573	2,596				
Workers' Party	Peter Short	0.4	193					
Fathers Rights	Luke Martin	0.3	169					
Independent	Dermot Duke	0.2	127					
Electorate: 86,007 Valid: 55,014 Spoilt: 592 (1.1%) Quota: 11,003 Turnout: 55,606 (64.7%)

=== 2002 general election ===
2002 general election: Louth
Party	Candidate	FPv%	Count							
Party	Candidate	FPv%	1	2	3	4	5	6	7	8
Fianna Fáil	Dermot Ahern	20.2	9,603							
Sinn Féin	Arthur Morgan	14.9	7,121	7,275	7,488	7,495	7,805	8,474	8,992	9,477
Fianna Fáil	Séamus Kirk	13.6	6,495	6,561	6,768	6,811	6,993	7,644	7,960	9,987
Fine Gael	Fergus O'Dowd	11.6	5,505	5,540	5,686	5,688	6,098	6,346	7,740	10,175
Fianna Fáil	Frank Maher	9.8	4,653	4,668	4,807	4,811	4,946	5,018	5,643	
Fine Gael	Terry Brennan	8.7	4,130	4,207	4,442	4,449	4,670	5,394	6,046	6,133
Labour	Michael Bell	6.7	3,185	3,237	3,388	3,391	3,732	4,117		
Independent	Mary Grehan	5.0	2,384	2,496	3,021	3,030	3,521			
Green	Bernadette Martin	4.2	1,979	2,109	2,306	2,309				
Independent	Martin Bellew	2.7	1,307	1,410						
Independent	Frank Godfrey	1.0	473	502						
Independent	Aidan Mahon	0.6	294							
Independent	Liam Ó Gogain	0.5	239							
Workers' Party	Peter Short	0.4	176							
Christian Solidarity	Michael Maguire	0.2	79							
Electorate: 81,952 Valid: 47,623 Spoilt: 651 (1.4%) Quota: 9,525 Turnout: 48,274 (58.9%)

=== 1997 general election ===
1997 general election: Louth
Party	Candidate	FPv%	Count											
Party	Candidate	FPv%	1	2	3	4	5	6	7	8	9	10	11	12
Fianna Fáil	Dermot Ahern	22.6	10,192											
Fianna Fáil	Séamus Kirk	12.6	5,667	6,334	6,381	6,544	6,594	6,697	6,881	8,160	9,399			
Labour	Michael Bell	10.5	4,725	4,771	4,829	4,851	4,958	5,236	5,518	5,905	6,230	6,755	7,316	7,430
Fine Gael	Fergus O'Dowd	10.0	4,486	4,499	4,506	4,538	4,598	4,867	5,066	5,437	5,704	5,871	6,953	7,049
Fine Gael	Brendan McGahon	9.7	4,346	4,429	4,504	4,584	4,597	4,638	4,859	4,867	5,356	5,868	8,075	8,262
Fine Gael	Terry Brennan	8.3	3,723	3,776	3,807	3,840	3,851	3,875	4,035	4,050	4,307	4,588		
Sinn Féin	Owen Hanratty	6.1	2,760	2,816	2,890	2,934	3,426	3,465	3,602	3,658	3,813			
Progressive Democrats	Mary Grehan	5.3	2,395	2,536	2,592	2,681	2,694	2,760	3,041	3,256				
Fianna Fáil	Maria O'Brien Campbell	4.8	2,151	2,215	2,221	2,245	2,295	2,474	2,533					
Green	Neil McCann	3.1	1,403	1,428	1,531	1,636	1,685	1,762						
Independent	Frank Godfrey	2.3	1,037	1,045	1,067	1,118	1,167							
Sinn Féin	Maeve Healy	2.0	891	899	916	929								
Independent	Michael G. Salter	1.5	686	695	725									
Independent	Brian Doyle	1.1	475	491										
Independent	Dessie Taaffe	0.2	71	72										
Electorate: 71,086 Valid: 45,008 Spoilt: 603 (1.3%) Quota: 9,002 Turnout: 45,611 (64.2%)

=== 1992 general election ===
1992 general election: Louth
Party	Candidate	FPv%	Count								
Party	Candidate	FPv%	1	2	3	4	5	6	7	8	9
Labour	Michael Bell	22.1	9,608								
Fianna Fáil	Dermot Ahern	17.7	7,704	7,766	7,788	7,810	7,826	8,003	8,271	8,707	
Fine Gael	Brendan McGahon	15.3	6,672	6,825	6,887	6,942	6,950	7,092	7,211	7,916	8,087
Fianna Fáil	Séamus Kirk	15.2	6,602	6,654	6,666	6,710	6,721	6,948	7,086	7,285	9,835
Fine Gael	Henry Mount Charles	9.6	4,161	4,344	4,382	4,438	4,470	4,541	4,598	4,750	5,304
Fianna Fáil	Tommy Murphy	8.9	3,853	4,108	4,117	4,127	4,188	4,306	4,468	4,553	
Independent	Tom Bellew	3.7	1,603	1,663	1,711	1,754	1,768	1,903	2,060		
Sinn Féin	Seán Kenna	3.0	1,289	1,306	1,317	1,328	1,584	1,616			
Independent	Maimie Ahern	2.3	1,017	1,045	1,065	1,100	1,112				
Sinn Féin	Tommy Murtagh	1.0	416	440	453	472					
Independent	Dessie Taaffe	0.7	296	314	354						
Workers' Party	Peter Short	0.6	249	310							
Electorate: 65,896 Valid: 43,470 Spoilt: 928 (2.1%) Quota: 8,695 Turnout: 44,398 (67.4%)

=== 1989 general election ===
1989 general election: Louth
Party	Candidate	FPv%	Count						
Party	Candidate	FPv%	1	2	3	4	5	6	7
Labour	Michael Bell	19.2	8,375	8,601	9,011				
Fine Gael	Brendan McGahon	17.9	7,812	8,289	8,931				
Fianna Fáil	Séamus Kirk	15.8	6,892	6,930	7,151	7,563	8,117	8,198	8,272
Fianna Fáil	Jimmy Mulroy	13.9	6,052	6,140	6,211	6,441	6,907	6,968	7,013
Fianna Fáil	Dermot Ahern	13.6	5,924	5,950	6,062	6,500	6,884	6,929	7,018
Sinn Féin	Arthur Morgan	5.3	2,291	3,042	3,712	3,901			
Independent	Bernard Markey	5.1	2,217	2,324	2,379				
Progressive Democrats	Frank Aiken	4.9	2,146	2,293					
Fine Gael	Richard Brannigan	4.0	1,744						
Independent	Ronald Smith	0.4	159						
Electorate: 63,151 Valid: 43,612 Quota: 8,723 Turnout: 69.1%

=== 1987 general election ===
1987 general election: Louth
Party	Candidate	FPv%	Count								
Party	Candidate	FPv%	1	2	3	4	5	6	7	8	9
Fianna Fáil	Séamus Kirk	15.3	7,156	7,197	7,209	7,724	8,115	8,349	11,066		
Labour	Michael Bell	13.3	6,205	6,465	6,842	7,154	7,440	7,628	8,923	9,048	9,191
Fianna Fáil	Dermot Ahern	12.4	5,822	5,876	5,884	6,314	6,952	7,031	8,580	8,622	10,128
Fianna Fáil	Jimmy Mulroy	11.7	5,492	5,538	5,626	5,818	5,920	5,970			
Fine Gael	Brendan McGahon	11.4	5,319	5,378	6,035	6,255	7,019	10,037			
Progressive Democrats	Frank Aiken	11.2	5,219	5,276	5,534	5,672	6,171	6,758	6,959	7,467	7,522
Fine Gael	Joseph Lennon	7.6	3,560	3,579	4,105	4,186	4,282				
Independent	Thomas Bellew	5.8	2,709	2,787	2,800	3,082					
Sinn Féin	Arthur Morgan	5.6	2,599	2,682	2,692						
Fine Gael	Fergus O'Dowd	4.2	1,941	1,964							
Workers' Party	Donnchadha MacRaghnaill	1.2	570								
Independent	Ronald Smith	0.2	86								
Independent	Charles Ross	0.2	66								
Independent	Barbara Hyland	0.1	65								
Electorate: 61,991 Valid: 46,809 Quota: 9,362 Turnout: 75.5%

=== November 1982 general election ===
November 1982 general election: Louth
Party	Candidate	FPv%	Count					
Party	Candidate	FPv%	1	2	3	4	5	6
Fianna Fáil	Pádraig Faulkner	15.6	6,793	7,033	7,264	7,419	11,288	
Labour	Michael Bell	14.7	6,435	7,241	7,431	7,629	7,812	8,451
Fianna Fáil	Séamus Kirk	13.9	6,066	6,126	6,750	6,869	8,791	
Fianna Fáil	Thomas Bellew	13.7	5,966	6,083	6,450	6,545		
Fine Gael	Brendan McGahon	12.1	5,269	5,325	5,511	7,881	8,197	8,873
Fine Gael	Bernard Markey	10.9	4,745	4,816	4,932			
Fine Gael	Thomas Donegan	10.9	4,737	4,886	4,935	6,855	7,015	7,221
Independent	Micheal O'Donnell	4.4	1,915	2,036				
Independent	Frank Godfrey	2.2	951					
Workers' Party	Donnchadha MacRaghnaill	1.5	671					
Independent	Aíne Ní Ghidhir	0.3	129					
Electorate: 58,556 Valid: 43,677 Quota: 8,736 Turnout: 74.6%

=== February 1982 general election ===
February 1982 general election: Louth
Party	Candidate	FPv%	Count					
Party	Candidate	FPv%	1	2	3	4	5	6
Fianna Fáil	Pádraig Faulkner	18.6	8,083	8,492	9,016			
Fine Gael	Bernard Markey	18.2	7,928	8,237	8,543	8,562	10,197	
Fianna Fáil	Thomas Bellew	14.5	6,305	6,427	7,143	7,219	7,961	8,050
Fianna Fáil	Eddie Filgate	14.1	6,109	6,204	6,862	7,055	7,391	7,428
Fine Gael	Brendan McGahon	12.2	5,311	5,406	5,629	5,635	6,001	7,177
Sinn Féin	Francis Browne	8.5	3,714	4,117				
Labour	Michael Bell	8.0	3,474	4,422	4,928	4,947		
Independent	Frank Godfrey	3.8	1,662					
Sinn Féin The Workers' Party	Donnchadha Mac Raghnaill	1.7	742					
Independent	Helen Corcoran	0.4	183					
Electorate: 57,075 Valid: 43,511 Spoilt: 451 (1.0%) Quota: 8,703 Turnout: 43,962 (77.0%)

=== 1981 general election ===
Pádraig Faulkner was Ceann Comhairle at the dissolution of the 21st Dáil and therefore deemed to be returned automatically. The constituency was treated as a three-seater for the purposes of calculating the quota.

1981 general election: Louth
Party	Candidate	FPv%	Count						
Party	Candidate	FPv%	1	2	3	4	5	6	7
Fianna Fáil	Pádraig Faulkner	N/A	Returned automatically						
Anti H-Block	Paddy Agnew	18.3	8,368	8,846	8,998	9,525	9,841	10,409	10,814
Fianna Fáil	Eddie Filgate	12.7	5,823	5,914	7,235	7,308	7,553	11,076	11,325
Fianna Fáil	Thomas Bellew	11.6	5,314	5,413	5,672	5,794	6,059		
Fianna Fáil	John Connor	10.7	4,920	5,276	6,047	6,791	6,812	8,190	8,829
Fine Gael	Bernard Markey	10.3	4,694	4,810	5,007	5,258	8,316	8,513	13,315
Fine Gael	Brendan McGahon	10.1	4,612	4,723	4,770	4,932			
Fine Gael	Dick Branigan	9.6	4,372	4,624	4,687	5,548	6,463	6,651	
Fianna Fáil	Nicholas McCabe	6.1	2,804	2,887					
Labour	Michael Bell	5.5	2,515	3,128	3,147				
Independent	Frank Godfrey	2.6	1,210						
Sinn Féin The Workers' Party	Donnchadha Mac Raghnaill	1.7	785						
Labour	James McArdle	0.8	346						
Electorate: 57,075 Valid: 45,763 Spoilt: 514 (1.1%) Quota: 11,441 Turnout: 46,277 (81.1%)

=== 1977 general election ===
1977 general election: Louth
Party	Candidate	FPv%	Count									
Party	Candidate	FPv%	1	2	3	4	5	6	7	8	9	10
Fianna Fáil	Pádraig Faulkner	24.0	10,244									
Fine Gael	Paddy Donegan	22.2	9,455									
Fianna Fáil	Eddie Filgate	14.0	5,954	6,662	6,693	6,742	6,788	6,841	7,019	7,098	7,454	8,096
Fianna Fáil	Joseph Farrell	12.7	5,402	6,197	6,227	6,333	6,387	6,438	6,477	6,574	6,942	7,956
Independent	Jimmy Bellew	5.9	2,523	2,548	2,592	2,647	2,776	2,992	3,099	3,307	3,778	
Sinn Féin The Workers' Party	Donnchadha MacRaghnaill	4.4	1,894	1,951	1,980	2,228	2,268	2,300	2,353	2,972		
Fine Gael	Bernard Markey	4.0	1,718	1,734	2,000	2,032	2,086	2,643	4,002	4,520	4,862	5,764
Labour	Fergus O'Dowd	3.0	1,289	1,330	1,395	1,583	2,019	2,093	2,175			
Fine Gael	Hugh McGahon	2.9	1,252	1,259	1,376	1,385	1,456					
Fine Gael	Joseph Lennon	2.9	1,241	1,253	1,539	1,570	1,656	2,053				
Labour	Frank Carney	2.1	908	917	944	959						
Independent	Frank Godfrey	1.8	751	798	831							
Electorate: 53,895 Valid: 42,631 Quota: 8,527 Turnout: 79.1%

=== 1973 general election ===
1973 general election: Louth
Party	Candidate	FPv%	Count						
Party	Candidate	FPv%	1	2	3	4	5	6	7
Fianna Fáil	Pádraig Faulkner	29.6	9,256						
Fine Gael	Paddy Donegan	21.7	6,787	6,881	6,939	6,969	7,036	7,276	7,383
Fianna Fáil	Joseph Farrell	21.6	6,767	7,999					
Fine Gael	Brid O'Rourke	11.3	3,532	3,558	3,575	3,587	3,672	3,856	3,877
Labour	Paul Callan	8.2	2,577	2,603	2,634	2,659	2,730	3,394	3,436
Sinn Féin	Donnchadha MacRaghnaill	4.6	1,450	1,474	1,501	1,546	1,730		
Aontacht Éireann	Míceál O'Donnell	1.5	472	482	488	617			
Aontacht Éireann	James Sarsfield	0.8	263	271	277				
Independent	Geoffrey Eager	0.7	210	217					
Electorate: 40,278 Valid: 31,314 Quota: 7,829 Turnout: 77.7%

=== 1969 general election ===
1969 general election: Louth
Party	Candidate	FPv%	Count				
Party	Candidate	FPv%	1	2	3	4	5
Fine Gael	Paddy Donegan	28.5	8,618				
Fianna Fáil	Frank Aiken	24.2	7,312	7,330	7,357	7,429	7,653
Fianna Fáil	Pádraig Faulkner	22.7	6,883	6,972	7,017	7,136	7,741
Labour	Paul Callan	9.2	2,800	2,863	3,753	3,929	
Fine Gael	Thomas Elmore	6.8	2,073	2,687	2,727	4,027	5,262
Fine Gael	Francis Johnston	5.0	1,513	1,757	1,812		
Labour	Patrick Mulholland	3.6	1,077	1,097			
Electorate: 38,370 Valid: 30,276 Quota: 7,570 Turnout: 78.9%

=== 1965 general election ===
1965 general election: Louth
Party	Candidate	FPv%	Count	
Party	Candidate	FPv%	1	2
Fine Gael	Paddy Donegan	24.4	6,897	8,039
Fianna Fáil	Frank Aiken	23.6	6,679	6,972
Fianna Fáil	Pádraig Faulkner	23.4	6,617	7,132
Fine Gael	Patrick O'Hare	16.3	4,605	5,653
Labour	Proinsias Mac Aonghusa	12.3	3,461	
Electorate: 36,629 Valid: 28,259 Quota: 7,065 Turnout: 77.2%

=== 1961 general election ===
1961 general election: Louth
Party	Candidate	FPv%	Count				
Party	Candidate	FPv%	1	2	3	4	5
Fianna Fáil	Frank Aiken	26.9	6,869				
Fine Gael	Paddy Donegan	25.5	6,518				
Fianna Fáil	Pádraig Faulkner	16.8	4,288	4,726	4,737	4,934	5,972
Fine Gael	Patrick O'Hare	15.7	4,003	4,026	4,127	4,315	5,037
Independent	Peter Moore	10.8	2,749	2,759	2,772	3,220	
Sinn Féin	Larry Grogan	4.4	1,130	1,138	1,141		
Electorate: 36,850 Valid: 25,557 Quota: 6,390 Turnout: 69.4%

=== 1957 general election ===
1957 general election: Louth
Party	Candidate	FPv%	Count			
Party	Candidate	FPv%	1	2	3	4
Fianna Fáil	Frank Aiken	25.2	7,972			
Fine Gael	George Coburn	21.3	6,745	6,750	7,109	7,728
Fianna Fáil	Pádraig Faulkner	21.1	6,672	6,720	6,897	7,781
Fine Gael	Paddy Donegan	18.5	5,855	5,857	6,356	6,804
Sinn Féin	Larry Grogan	9.4	2,991	2,992	3,305	
Labour	James Murphy	4.5	1,424	1,425		
Electorate: 41,814 Valid: 31,659 Quota: 7,915 Turnout: 75.7%

=== 1954 general election ===
1954 general election: Louth
Party	Candidate	FPv%	Count				
Party	Candidate	FPv%	1	2	3	4	5
Fine Gael	George Coburn	31.9	10,778				
Fianna Fáil	Frank Aiken	26.0	8,769				
Fianna Fáil	Laurence Walsh	17.6	5,945	5,999	6,308	6,483	6,957
Fine Gael	Paddy Donegan	13.8	4,665	6,576	6,580	6,764	8,639
Labour	Roddy Connolly	7.6	2,576	2,895	2,903	3,366	
Sinn Féin	Joseph Campbell	3.0	1,011	1,068	1,079		
Electorate: 41,906 Valid: 33,744 Quota: 8,437 Turnout: 80.5%

=== 1954 by-election ===
Fine Gael TD James Coburn died on 5 December 1953. A by-election was held to fill the vacancy on 3 March 1954. The seat was won by the Fine Gael candidate George Coburn, son of the deceased TD.

1954 by-election: Louth
Party	Candidate	FPv%	Count		
Party	Candidate	FPv%	1	2	3
Fine Gael	George Coburn	43.4	13,360	13,817	16,459
Fianna Fáil	Pádraig Faulkner	40.7	12,531	12,801	13,432
Labour	Roddy Connolly	11.2	3,452	3,952	
Sinn Féin	Joseph Campbell	4.7	1,446		
Electorate: 41,975 Valid: 30,789 Quota: 15,395 Turnout: 73.4%

=== 1951 general election ===
1951 general election: Louth
Party	Candidate	FPv%	Count	
Party	Candidate	FPv%	1	2
Fianna Fáil	Frank Aiken	24.9	7,927	7,981
Fianna Fáil	Laurence Walsh	24.5	7,792	8,009
Fine Gael	James Coburn	21.3	6,779	9,984
Labour	Roddy Connolly	15.2	4,856	5,845
Fine Gael	Thomas Francis Roe	14.1	4,505	
Electorate: 41,646 Valid: 31,859 Quota: 7,965 Turnout: 76.5%

=== 1948 general election ===
1948 general election: Louth
Party	Candidate	FPv%	Count				
Party	Candidate	FPv%	1	2	3	4	5
Fianna Fáil	Frank Aiken	28.0	8,589				
Fine Gael	James Coburn	23.6	7,251	7,342	7,368	7,716	
Fianna Fáil	Laurence Walsh	16.6	5,107	5,867	5,912	6,012	6,724
Fine Gael	Thomas F. Roe	12.5	3,854	3,862	3,955	4,198	
Labour	Roddy Connolly	12.3	3,767	3,802	3,912	4,818	6,879
Clann na Poblachta	Aodh De Blacam	4.4	1,348	1,356	1,886		
Clann na Poblachta	George Owens	2.7	814	818			
Electorate: 40,740 Valid: 30,730 Quota: 7,683 Turnout: 75.4%

=== 1944 general election ===
1944 general election: Louth
Party	Candidate	FPv%	Count				
Party	Candidate	FPv%	1	2	3	4	5
Fianna Fáil	Frank Aiken	25.6	7,493				
Fine Gael	James Coburn	22.8	6,672	6,690	6,808	8,310	
Fianna Fáil	Laurence Walsh	20.5	5,996	6,145	6,359	6,920	7,105
Clann na Talmhan	Frank Jeffers	17.1	5,000	5,005	5,138	6,009	6,725
Labour	Roddy Connolly	11.2	3,287	3,295	3,559		
Ailtirí na hAiséirghe	Eoin Ó Coigligh	2.7	795	797			
Electorate: 39,506 Valid: 29,243 Quota: 7,311 Turnout: 74.0%

=== 1943 general election ===
1943 general election: Louth
Party	Candidate	FPv%	Count					
Party	Candidate	FPv%	1	2	3	4	5	6
Fianna Fáil	Frank Aiken	28.2	8,723					
Fine Gael	James Coburn	22.7	7,005	7,072	7,123	9,035		
Labour	Roddy Connolly	15.8	4,880	4,932	5,190	5,609	6,252	7,527
Clann na Talmhan	Frank Jeffers	12.0	3,698	3,719	3,764	4,005	4,608	5,071
Fianna Fáil	Laurence Walsh	10.7	3,318	4,118	4,261	4,392	4,454	
Fine Gael	John Callan	8.7	2,698	2,744	2,783			
Ailtirí na hAiséirghe	Eoin Ó Coigligh	1.9	585	595				
Electorate: 39,506 Valid: 30,907 Quota: 7,727 Turnout: 78.2%

=== 1938 general election ===
1938 general election: Louth
Party	Candidate	FPv%	Count	
Party	Candidate	FPv%	1	2
Fianna Fáil	Frank Aiken	31.8	9,787	
Fine Gael	James Coburn	27.2	8,375	
Fianna Fáil	Laurence Walsh	20.1	6,200	8,137
Fine Gael	Patrick Roe	14.1	4,353	4,398
Labour	Michael O'Connor	4.4	1,351	1,414
Labour	Anthony Flynn	2.4	740	780
Electorate: 38,665 Valid: 30,806 Quota: 7,702 Turnout: 79.7%

=== 1937 general election ===
1937 general election: Louth
Party	Candidate	FPv%	Count	
Party	Candidate	FPv%	1	2
Fianna Fáil	Frank Aiken	31.0	9,215	
Fine Gael	James Coburn	28.2	8,364	
Fianna Fáil	Laurence Walsh	22.8	6,768	8,449
Fine Gael	James Murphy	18.0	5,341	5,452
Electorate: 38,570 Valid: 29,688 Quota: 7,423 Turnout: 77.0%

=== 1933 general election ===
1933 general election: Louth
Party	Candidate	FPv%	Count	
Party	Candidate	FPv%	1	2
Fianna Fáil	Frank Aiken	34.9	10,235	
Cumann na nGaedheal	James Murphy	26.0	7,632	
Independent	James Coburn	24.8	7,282	7,484
Fianna Fáil	John O'Dowd	14.2	4,175	6,876
Electorate: 36,803 Valid: 29,324 Quota: 7,332 Turnout: 79.7%

=== 1932 general election ===
1932 general election: Louth
Party	Candidate	FPv%	Count			
Party	Candidate	FPv%	1	2	3	4
Fianna Fáil	Frank Aiken	26.3	7,267			
Cumann na nGaedheal	James Murphy	22.0	6,094	6,101	6,824	7,094
Independent	James Coburn	20.2	5,594	5,606	6,135	6,501
Cumann na nGaedheal	Peter Hughes	16.3	4,512	4,523	4,804	5,035
Labour	David Blood	7.9	2,192	2,235		
Fianna Fáil	Kevin O'Reilly	7.3	2,019	2,293	2,823	
Electorate: 36,260 Valid: 27,678 Quota: 6,920 Turnout: 76.3%

=== September 1927 general election ===
September 1927 general election: Louth
Party	Candidate	FPv%	Count		
Party	Candidate	FPv%	1	2	3
Fianna Fáil	Frank Aiken	29.6	7,881		
Cumann na nGaedheal	James Murphy	24.2	6,425	6,444	6,533
Cumann na nGaedheal	Peter Hughes	22.1	5,886	5,937	6,010
National League	James Coburn	21.3	5,666	5,931	7,034
Fianna Fáil	Laurence McKenna	2.8	733	1,631	
Electorate: 36,703 Valid: 26,591 Quota: 6,648 Turnout: 72.5%

=== June 1927 general election ===
June 1927 general election: Louth
Party	Candidate	FPv%	Count						
Party	Candidate	FPv%	1	2	3	4	5	6	7
National League	James Coburn	26.4	7,093						
Fianna Fáil	Frank Aiken	25.5	6,851						
Cumann na nGaedheal	Peter Hughes	14.4	3,886	4,002	4,007	4,037	4,203	4,489	4,956
Cumann na nGaedheal	James Murphy	14.1	3,787	3,843	3,845	3,906	3,966	4,391	5,177
Labour	Michael Connor	6.9	1,867	1,926	1,931	2,164	2,716	3,356	
Independent	Matthew Campbell	6.5	1,738	1,797	1,806	1,906	2,037		
Labour	Thomas O'Hanlon	3.5	930	986	992	1,074			
Fianna Fáil	Laurence McKenna	2.8	748	769	867				
Electorate: 36,703 Valid: 26,900 Quota: 6,726 Turnout: 73.3%

=== 1923 general election ===
1923 general election: Louth
Party	Candidate	FPv%	Count		
Party	Candidate	FPv%	1	2	3
Republican	Frank Aiken	27.1	6,651		
Cumann na nGaedheal	Peter Hughes	23.7	5,798	5,836	6,302
Cumann na nGaedheal	James Murphy	23.1	5,663	5,677	6,751
Farmers' Party	Patrick McGee	15.8	3,877	4,021	4,784
Labour	Cathal O'Shannon	10.3	2,517	2,845	
Electorate: 38,548 Valid: 24,506 Quota: 6,127 Turnout: 63.6%

== See also ==
- Elections in the Republic of Ireland
- Politics of the Republic of Ireland
- List of Dáil by-elections
- List of political parties in the Republic of Ireland
