= Cathaoirleach (disambiguation) =

Cathaoirleach is the Irish word for chairperson.

In particular it may refer to:

- Cathaoirleach of Seanad Éireann, the Irish Senate
- In local government in the Republic of Ireland, the Cathaoirleach or Mayor of a council
- In the structure of the Gaelic Athletic Association, the Cathaoirleach of a board, council, or club
