= Joseph Farrell (politician) =

Irish politician (1905–1999)

Teachta Dála
- In office February 1973 – June 1981
- Constituency: Louth

Senator
- In office 14 December 1961 – 28 February 1973
- Constituency: Labour Panel

Personal details
- Born: 1 July 1905 County Louth, Ireland
- Died: 24 November 1999 (aged 94) County Louth, Ireland
- Party: Fianna Fáil

Joseph Farrell (1 July 1905 – 24 November 1999) was an Irish Fianna Fáil politician. He was elected to Seanad Éireann in 1961 on the Labour Panel and was re-elected to the Seanad in 1965 and 1969.

As a young man he was a member of the IRA and participated in the Irish War of Independence and the Irish Civil War on the Republican side. During this time he formed a close friendship with Frank Aiken who headed the Fianna Fáil organisation in Louth and became one of the party's Councillors on Dundalk Urban District Council and on Louth County Council. He served as Cathaoirleach of Dundalk UDC on a number of occasions and was also twice President of the Association of Municipalities of Ireland (AMAI).

After Charles Haughey's selection as a candidate for the 1973 general election, Aiken informed Jack Lynch that he would publicly renounce his resignation as a candidate were he selected to run. Despite entreaties from Lynch and President Éamon de Valera, Aiken refused to do so but following pleas from Farrell at the request of Lynch on the night of the selection convention in the Town Hall in Dundalk, Aiken publicly announced his retirement from politics on doctor's orders and endorsed Farrell's candidacy to succeed him. He never again attended any Fianna Fáil function thereafter thus ending speculation that he would attempt to succeed de Valera as president.

Farrell was elected to Dáil Éireann as a Fianna Fáil Teachta Dála (TD) for the Louth constituency at the 1973 general election and was re-elected at the 1977 general election. He did not contest the 1981 general election.

In fact at a Fianna Fáil party selection convention in Dundalk in 1981 he was de-selected by the then Constituency Delegate Cllr Thomas Bellew. Farrell remained a member of Louth County Council and retained his seat in 1985 by which time Bellew was then an Independent member of the Council. He retired from politics in 1991.

Farrell had always been an opponent of Charles J. Haughey throughout his time as a Fianna Fáil party member even while as a Party Vice-President during the 1980s. His wife, Margaret known as (Baby) pre-deceased him. The couple had no children.

His niece, Mairead Farrell, was killed by the SAS in Gibraltar in 1988 and was the subject of the documentary "Death on the Rock."

Dáil	Election	Deputy (Party)	Deputy (Party)	Deputy (Party)	Deputy (Party)	Deputy (Party)
4th	1923	Frank Aiken (Rep)	Peter Hughes (CnaG)	James Murphy (CnaG)	3 seats until 1977	
5th	1927 (Jun)	Frank Aiken (FF)	James Coburn (NL)	James Murphy (CnaG)	3 seats until 1977	
6th	1927 (Sep)	Frank Aiken (FF)	James Coburn (NL)	James Murphy (CnaG)	3 seats until 1977	
7th	1932	Frank Aiken (FF)	James Coburn (Ind.)	James Murphy (CnaG)	3 seats until 1977	
8th	1933	Frank Aiken (FF)	James Coburn (Ind.)	James Murphy (CnaG)	3 seats until 1977	
9th	1937	Frank Aiken (FF)	James Coburn (FG)	Laurence Walsh (FF)	3 seats until 1977	
10th	1938	Frank Aiken (FF)	James Coburn (FG)	Laurence Walsh (FF)	3 seats until 1977	
11th	1943	Frank Aiken (FF)	James Coburn (FG)	Roddy Connolly (Lab)	3 seats until 1977	
12th	1944	Frank Aiken (FF)	James Coburn (FG)	Laurence Walsh (FF)	3 seats until 1977	
13th	1948	Frank Aiken (FF)	James Coburn (FG)	Roddy Connolly (Lab)	3 seats until 1977	
14th	1951	Frank Aiken (FF)	James Coburn (FG)	Laurence Walsh (FF)	3 seats until 1977	
14th	1954 by-election	Frank Aiken (FF)	George Coburn (FG)	Laurence Walsh (FF)	3 seats until 1977	
15th	1954	Frank Aiken (FF)	George Coburn (FG)	Paddy Donegan (FG)	3 seats until 1977	
16th	1957	Frank Aiken (FF)	George Coburn (FG)	Pádraig Faulkner (Note: Faulker served as Ceann Comhairle in the 21st Dáil from 1977 to 1981, and was returned automatically at the 1981 election.) (FF)	3 seats until 1977	
17th	1961	Frank Aiken (FF)	Paddy Donegan (FG)	Pádraig Faulkner (FF)	3 seats until 1977	
18th	1965	Frank Aiken (FF)	Paddy Donegan (FG)	Pádraig Faulkner (FF)	3 seats until 1977	
19th	1969	Frank Aiken (FF)	Paddy Donegan (FG)	Pádraig Faulkner (FF)	3 seats until 1977	
20th	1973	Joseph Farrell (FF)	Paddy Donegan (FG)	Pádraig Faulkner (FF)	3 seats until 1977	
21st	1977	Joseph Farrell (FF)	Paddy Donegan (FG)	Pádraig Faulkner (FF)	Eddie Filgate (FF)	4 seats 1977–2011
22nd	1981	Paddy Agnew (AHB)	Bernard Markey (FG)	Pádraig Faulkner (FF)	Eddie Filgate (FF)	4 seats 1977–2011
23rd	1982 (Feb)	Thomas Bellew (FF)	Bernard Markey (FG)	Pádraig Faulkner (FF)	Eddie Filgate (FF)	4 seats 1977–2011
24th	1982 (Nov)	Michael Bell (Lab)	Brendan McGahon (FG)	Pádraig Faulkner (FF)	Séamus Kirk (Note: Kirk served as Ceann Comhairle in the 30th Dáil from 2009 to 2011, and was returned automatically at the 2011 election.) (FF)	4 seats 1977–2011
25th	1987	Michael Bell (Lab)	Brendan McGahon (FG)	Dermot Ahern (FF)	Séamus Kirk (FF)	4 seats 1977–2011
26th	1989	Michael Bell (Lab)	Brendan McGahon (FG)	Dermot Ahern (FF)	Séamus Kirk (FF)	4 seats 1977–2011
27th	1992	Michael Bell (Lab)	Brendan McGahon (FG)	Dermot Ahern (FF)	Séamus Kirk (FF)	4 seats 1977–2011
28th	1997	Michael Bell (Lab)	Brendan McGahon (FG)	Dermot Ahern (FF)	Séamus Kirk (FF)	4 seats 1977–2011
29th	2002	Arthur Morgan (SF)	Fergus O'Dowd (FG)	Dermot Ahern (FF)	Séamus Kirk (FF)	4 seats 1977–2011
30th	2007	Arthur Morgan (SF)	Fergus O'Dowd (FG)	Dermot Ahern (FF)	Séamus Kirk (FF)	4 seats 1977–2011
31st	2011	Gerry Adams (SF)	Fergus O'Dowd (FG)	Ged Nash (Lab)	Séamus Kirk (FF)	Peter Fitzpatrick (FG)
32nd	2016	Gerry Adams (SF)	Fergus O'Dowd (FG)	Declan Breathnach (FF)	Imelda Munster (SF)	Peter Fitzpatrick (FG)
33rd	2020	Ruairí Ó Murchú (SF)	Fergus O'Dowd (FG)	Ged Nash (Lab)	Imelda Munster (SF)	Peter Fitzpatrick (Ind.)
34th	2024	Ruairí Ó Murchú (SF)	Paula Butterly (FG)	Ged Nash (Lab)	Joanna Byrne (SF)	Erin McGreehan (FF)
