= Joseph Lennon =

Irish politician (1933–1990)

Senator
- In office 13 May 1982 – 25 April 1987
- Constituency: Agricultural Panel

Personal details
- Born: 22 June 1933; County Louth, Ireland
- Died: 25 January 1990 (aged 56); County Louth, Ireland
- Political party: Fine Gael

Joseph Lennon (22 June 1933 – 25 January 1990) was a Fine Gael politician from County Louth in Ireland. He was a senator from 1982 to 1987.

A farmer and local councillor in County Louth, Lennon stood unsuccessfully as a Fine Gael candidate for Dáil Éireann in the Louth constituency at the 1977 and 1987 general elections.

In 1982, he was elected to the 16th Seanad on the Agricultural Panel, and was re-elected in 1983 to the 17th Seanad, serving until 1987 elections.
