= 2019 Louth County Council election =

Part of the 2019 Irish local elections

- 24 May 2019

All 29 seats on Louth County Council 15 seats needed for a majority
	First party	Second party	Third party
Party	Fianna Fáil	Sinn Féin	Fine Gael
Seats won	7	7	5
Seat change	▲2	▼3	▼2
	Fourth party	Fifth party	Sixth party
Party	Labour	Green	Independent
Seats won	3	1	6
Seat change	▲1	▼1	▲3
- Results by local electoral area
Council control after election
TBD

An election to all 29 seats on Louth County Council was held on 24 May 2019 as part of the 2019 Irish local elections. County Louth was divided into 5 local electoral areas (LEAs) to elect councillors for a five-year term of office on the electoral system of proportional representation by means of the single transferable vote (PR-STV).

== Boundary review ==
Following a recommendation of the 2018 LEA boundary review committee, the local electoral areas in County Louth were altered. The committee's terms of reference required a maximum number of councillors of 7 seats, which had been breached by the 10-seat Drogheda LEA used at the 2014 Louth County Council election. There were boundary adjustments in other LEAs to reflect by population shifts revealed by the 2016 census. The boundary committee recommended that Dundalk be designated a borough district. This was implemented in the initial statutory instrument, but reversed as being contrary to the terms of the Local Government Act 2001.

== Overview ==
Following the elections Sinn Féin and Fianna Fáil emerged as the joint largest party with 7 seats. Sinn Féin lost 1 seat in Dundalk and 2 in Drogheda. Fianna Fáil gained a seat from Sinn Féin and also from the Green Party in Dundalk. Accounting for the defection of Kevin Callan after 2014, Fine Gael returned with 5 seats, a loss of 2 seats overall. The Labour Party increased their numbers by 1 seat to 3 by gaining another seat in Drogheda.

Kevin Callan won a seat in each of the 2 Drogheda LEAs. He chose to sit for Drogheda Urban. The casual vacancy was filled at a meeting of the council on 17 June 2019 by Declan Power, who had run for Fianna Fáil in 2019 but who had since quit the party.

== Results by party ==
Party	Seats	±	1st pref	FPv%	±%
Sinn Féin	7	▼3	10,651	24.10	▼7.32
Fianna Fáil	7	▲2	8,624	19.51	▲0.48
Fine Gael	5	▼2	8,891	20.12	▼0.56
Labour	3	▲1	3,501	7.92	▲2.95
Green	1	▼1	2,829	6.40	▲2.54
Renua	0	Steady	1,463	3.31	New
Direct Democracy	0	Steady	142	0.32	▼1.59
United People	0	Steady	134	0.30	New
People Before Profit	0	Steady	101	0.23	▲0.06
Independent	6	▲3	7,854	17.77	▲1.27
Total	29	Steady	44,190	100.00	Steady

== Results by local electoral area ==
*: Outgoing councillor elected in 2014.
†: Outgoing councillor coopted subsequent to the 2014 election.

=== Ardee ===
Ardee: 6 seats
Party	Candidate	FPv%	Count								
Party	Candidate	FPv%	1	2	3	4	5	6	7	8	9
Fine Gael	Dolores Minogue	15.28%	1,404								
Fine Gael	Colm Markey (Note: See change below.)	15.11%	1,388								
Sinn Féin	Pearse McGeough	10.96%	1,007	1,011	1,018	1,040	1,055	1,113	1,411		
Independent	Jim Tenanty	10.40%	955	978	983	1,048	1,178	1,295	1,396		
Fianna Fáil	John Sheridan	9.47%	870	877	887	902	933	976	996	1,114	1,131
Independent	Hugh D. Conlon	8.35%	767	771	786	825	842	911	928	1,054	1,099
Fianna Fáil	Fintan Malone	7.07%	649	661	664	685	757	808	851	917	949
Green	Seán Connolly	5.54%	509	514	519	557	577	635	652		
Sinn Féin	Brendan McKenna	5.36%	492	500	501	515	553	576			
Independent	Kevin Carroll	4.57%	420	426	428	483	512				
Fine Gael	Finnan McCoy	4.42%	406	423	448	464					
Independent	Albert D. Byrne	2.07%	190	192	194						
Independent	Enda Murray	1.40%	129	132							
Electorate: 20,007 Valid: 9,186 Spoilt: 281 Quota: 1,313 Turnout: 9,467 (47.32%)

=== Drogheda Rural ===
Drogheda Rural: 4 seats
Party	Candidate	FPv%	Count						
Party	Candidate	FPv%	1	2	3	4	5	6	7
Fine Gael	Oliver Tully	16.62%	965	971	1,005	1,060	1,173		
Labour	Michelle Hall	16.60%	964	977	1,000	1,035	1,095	1,097	1,214
Independent	Kevin Callan	15.43%	896	912	937	1,048			
Sinn Féin	Tom Cunningham	11.42%	663	672	708	730	765	765	1,113
Sinn Féin	Leanne Saurin	10.38%	603	616	628	651	689	690	
Renua	Eamon Sweeney	9.78%	568	579	591	620	727	732	787
Fianna Fáil	Richard Cooney	8.21%	477	479	561	585			
Independent	Frank Godfrey	5.46%	317	323	343				
Fianna Fáil	Declan Power	4.46%	259	261					
United People	Jeffrey Rudd	0.88%	51						
Direct Democracy	Patrick Greene	0.77%	45						
Electorate: 13,070 Valid: 5,808 Spoilt: 123 Quota: 1,162 Turnout: 5,931 (45.62%)

=== Drogheda Urban ===
Drogheda Urban: 6 seats
Party	Candidate	FPv%	Count										
Party	Candidate	FPv%	1	2	3	4	5	6	7	8	9	10	11
Labour	Paul Bell	14.76%	1,292										
Labour	Pio Smith	14.22%	1,245	1,255									
Sinn Féin	Joanna Byrne	10.54%	923	927	939	959	975	1,109	1,129	1,372			
Independent	Kevin Callan	10.25%	897	902	905	913	936	951	996	1,012	1,030	1,124	1,292
Fianna Fáil	James Byrne	9.10%	797	801	804	804	807	816	838	848	853	1,076	1,251
Independent	Paddy McQuillan	8.78%	769	774	793	819	858	875	907	943	993	1,035	1,086
Fine Gael	Richie Culhane	6.64%	581	583	585	587	593	596	623	629	634	671	
Independent	Frank Godfrey	5.92%	518	523	525	527	551	560	646	664	681	772	881
Fianna Fáil	Anthony Moore	5.78%	506	507	510	511	521	524	577	586	589		
Renua	Michael O'Dowd	3.45%	302	304	309	314	354	359					
Sinn Féin	David Saurin	3.19%	279	280	290	295	303	367	373				
Sinn Féin	Kenneth Flood	2.98%	261	262	265	271	278						
Renua	Maria McCabe	1.19%	104	105	107	111							
People Before Profit	Angus Macdonald	1.15%	101	101	101								
Direct Democracy	Christopher Faulkner	1.11%	97	97	108	117							
United People	Jeffrey Rudd	0.95%	83	83									
Electorate: 20,424 Valid: 8,755 Spoilt: 241 Quota: 1,251 Turnout: 8,496 (44.05%)

=== Dundalk–Carlingford ===
Dundalk–Carlingford: 6 seats
Party	Candidate	FPv%	Count					
Party	Candidate	FPv%	1	2	3	4	5	6
Sinn Féin	Antóin Watters	16.48%	1,563					
Fine Gael	John McGahon	14.31%	1,357					
Fianna Fáil	Erin McGreehan	12.14%	1,151	1,216	1,222	1,237	1,535	
Fianna Fáil	Seán Kelly	11.30%	1,072	1,077	1,157	1,216	1,297	1,361
Fianna Fáil	Conor Keelan	10.66%	1,011	1,015	1,052	1,089	1,221	1,279
Sinn Féin	Edel Corrigan	9.82%	931	1,005	1,588			
Green	Eoin Daly	8.68%	823	834	875	976	1,112	1,180
Fine Gael	Roisin Duffy	8.53%	809	823	832	844		
Sinn Féin	Eugene Garvey	8.09%	767	802				
Electorate: 20,308 Valid: 9,484 Spoilt: 254 Quota: 1,355 Turnout: 9,738 (48.55%)

=== Dundalk South ===
Dundalk South: 7 seats
Party	Candidate	FPv%	Count								
Party	Candidate	FPv%	1	2	3	4	5	6	7	8	9
Independent	Maeve Yore	15.52%	1,701								
Green	Marianne Butler	13.66%	1,497								
Sinn Féin	Ruairí Ó Murchú	12.99%	1,423								
Fine Gael	Maria Doyle	12.28%	1,346	1,409							
Sinn Féin	Tomás Sharkey	10.37%	1,136	1,185	1,201	1,264	1,289	1,333	1,336	1,825	
Fianna Fáil	Liam Reilly	9.87%	1,082	1,131	1,142	1,155	1,157	1,229	1,233	1,262	1,300
Fianna Fáil	Emma Coffey	6.84%	750	805	836	885	888	1,006	1,021	1,098	1,181
Fine Gael	Linus English	5.80%	635	660	679	701	702	778	792	806	832
Sinn Féin	Anne Campbell	5.50%	603	621	638	674	695	755	758		
Renua	Niamh Boyle	4.46%	489	524	544	602	603				
Independent	Oliver Morgan	2.69%	295	332	345						
Electorate: 23,841 Valid: 10,957 Spoilt: 267 Quota: 1,370 Turnout: 11,224 (47.08%)

== Results by gender ==
2019 Louth County Council election Candidates by gender
Gender	Number of candidates	% of candidates	Elected councillors	% of councillors
Men	46	76.7%	20	69.0%
Women	14	23.3%	9	31.0%
TOTAL	60		29	

== Changes after 2019 ==
Party	Outgoing	LEA	Reason	Date	Co-optee
Independent	Kevin Callan	Drogheda Rural	Elected for two areas; chose to sit for Drogheda Urban	June 2019	Declan Power
Fine Gael	Oliver Tully	Drogheda Rural	Death on 9 July 2019	16 September 2019	Eileen Tully
Sinn Féin	Ruairí Ó Murchú	Dundalk South	Elected for Louth to the 33rd Dáil at the 2020 general election	24 February 2020	Kevin Meenan
Fine Gael	John McGahon	Dundalk–Carlingford	Elected for the Cultural and Educational Panel to the 26th Seanad at the 2020 Seanad election	20 July 2020	John Reilly
Fianna Fáil	Erin McGreehan	Dundalk–Carlingford	Nominated by the Taoiseach to the 26th Seanad	20 July 2020	Andrea McKevitt
Labour	Paul Bell	Drogheda Urban	Resigned on 28 June 2020 on his appointment to the Labour Court	21 September 2020	Fiachra Mac Raghnaill
Fine Gael	Colm Markey	Ardee	Co-opted to the European Parliament	16 February 2021	Paula Butterly
Independent	Hugh Conlon	Ardee	Death	July 2021	Bernie Conlon
Labour	Fiachra Mac Raghnaill	Drogheda Urban	Resigned on 6 February 2023	21 March 2023	Emma Cutlip Gallagher

== Sources ==
- "Louth County Council - Local Election candidates". RTÉ. 14 May 2019. Archived from the original on 6 June 2019.
- "Local Elections Results 2019". Louth County Council.
- "Local Elections 2019: Results, Transfer of Votes and Statistics" (PDF). Department of Housing, Planning and Local Government (DHPLG). pp. 152–157. Archived from the original (PDF) on 10 June 2020.
