= 2009 Louth County Council election =

Part of the 2009 Irish local elections

- 5 June 2009

26 seats on Louth County Council
	First party	Second party	Third party
Party	Fine Gael	Sinn Féin	Fianna Fáil
Seats won	8	6	5
Seat change	+1	+1	-4
	Fourth party	Fifth party	Sixth party
Party	Labour	Green	Independent
Seats won	2	1	4
Seat change	+1	+1	0
- Map showing the area of Louth County Council
Council control after election
TBD

An election to Louth County Council took place on 5 June 2009 as part of that year's Irish local elections. 26 councillors were elected from five local electoral areas (LEAs) for a five-year term of office on the electoral system of proportional representation by means of the single transferable vote (PR-STV).

== Results by party ==
Party	Seats	±	First Pref. votes	FPv%	±%
Fine Gael	8	+1	13,510	27.00	+3.63
Sinn Féin	6	+1	8,731	17.45	+0.55
Fianna Fáil	5	-4	11,899	23.78	-5.92
Labour	2	+1	5,553	11.10	+6.43
Green	1	+1	3,436	6.87	+2.16
Workers' Party	0	0	241	0.48	N/a
Independent	4	0	6,694	13.38	-3.45
Totals	26		50,041	100.00	—

== Results by local electoral area ==
=== Ardee ===
Ardee - 5 seats
Party	Candidate	FPv%	Count								
Party	Candidate	FPv%	1	2	3	4	5	6	7	8	9
Sinn Féin	Pearse McGeough*	14.89	1,536	1,547	1,569	1,594	1,689	1,712	1,768		
Fianna Fáil	Liam Reilly*	11.93	1,231	1,234	1,239	1,241	1,265	1,382	1,427	1,482	1,580
Fine Gael	Jim Lennon*	11.05	1,140	1,147	1,159	1,172	1,181	1,194	1,234	1,303	1,496
Fine Gael	Colm Markey	10.37	1,070	1,077	1,104	1,208	1,286	1,300	1,387	1,439	1,577
Fianna Fáil	Thomas Clare*	8.65	892	903	948	984	1,042	1,151	1,220	1,280	1,389
Fine Gael	Finnan McCoy*	8.56	883	889	900	946	965	1,038	1,160	1,366	1,600
Labour	Leonard Hatrick	6.92	714	740	762	776	798	870	995	1,212	
Green	Mary Kavanagh	6.16	635	658	676	678	692	731			
Independent	Jim Tenanty	6.00	619	637	659	666	728	804	898		
Fianna Fáil	Fintan Malone	5.43	560	569	571	575	580				
Independent	Jim Levins	3.60	371	379	412	428					
Fine Gael	Tommy McCabe	2.59	267	269	293						
Independent	Paul Drumgoole	2.23	230	258							
Independent	Albert Byrne	1.63	168								
Electorate: 17,501 Valid: 10,316 (58.95%) Spoilt: 137 Quota: 1,720 Turnout: 10,453 (59.73%)

=== Drogheda East ===
Drogheda East - 6 seats
Party	Candidate	FPv%	Count								
Party	Candidate	FPv%	1	2	3	4	5	6	7	8	9
Labour	Gerald Nash*	20.60	2,142								
Fianna Fáil	James Carroll*	14.38	1,495								
Fine Gael	Michael O'Dowd*	13.14	1,366	1,570							
Sinn Féin	Imelda Munster*	12.50	1,300	1,399	1,408	1,437	1,493				
Fine Gael	Oliver Tully*	12.01	1,249	1,329	1,362	1,384	1,444	1,541			
Fianna Fáil	Tommy Byrne	7.37	766	802	808	819	835	1,039	1,146	1,182	1,188
Independent	Frank Godfrey	7.21	750	870	882	897	947	1,006	1,178	1,196	1,199
Fine Gael	Richie Culhane	4.38	455	502	515	525	554	571			
Fianna Fáil	Jacqui McConville*	4.18	435	446	446	458	472				
Green	Yinka Dixon Oludaiye	2.51	261	290	294	375					
Green	Rachel Pearson	1.71	178	208	215						
Electorate: 19,658 Valid: 10,397 (52.89%) Spoilt: 139 Quota: 1,486 Turnout: 10,536 (53.60%)

=== Drogheda West ===
Drogheda West - 4 seats
Party	Candidate	FPv%	Count			
Party	Candidate	FPv%	1	2	3	4
Labour	Paul Bell	26.07	1,904			
Fine Gael	Anthony Donohoe*	16.43	1,200	1,310	1,397	1,560
Sinn Féin	Paddy McQuillan	14.38	1,050	1,124	1,171	1,452
Fianna Fáil	Frank Maher*	12.36	903	957	1,206	1,341
Fine Gael	Kevin Callan	11.71	855	930	1,006	1,166
Independent	Ken O'Heiligh*	10.64	777	862	965	
Green	Michael McKeon	4.29	313	344		
Fianna Fáil	Joe Lynch	4.13	302	316		
Electorate: 13,562 Valid: 7,304 (53.86%) Spoilt: 124 Quota: 1,461 Turnout: 7,428 (54.77%)

=== Dundalk-Carlingford ===
Dundalk-Carlingford - 5 seats
Party	Candidate	FPv%	Count							
Party	Candidate	FPv%	1	2	3	4	5	6	7	8
Fianna Fáil	Peter Savage*	15.62	1,643	1,676	1,702	1,748	1,815			
Fine Gael	Terry Brennan*	13.90	1,462	1,567	1,617	1,695	1,789			
Independent	Jim Ryan*	13.15	1,383	1,403	1,462	1,554	1,674	1,680	2,054	
Sinn Féin	Jim Loughran*	12.61	1,326	1,344	1,371	1,422	1,474	1,476	1,541	1,572
Sinn Féin	Edel Corrigan	12.20	1,283	1,291	1,324	1,340	1,423	1,426	1,526	1,577
Fianna Fáil	Conor Keelan	9.76	1,026	1,032	1,044	1,071	1,121	1,136	1,237	1,322
Fine Gael	Eamonn O'Boyle	6.98	734	822	854	890	964	967		
Green	Paraic McKevitt	5.72	601	622	683	717				
Independent	Pat Keenan	3.66	385	394	420					
Labour	Frank O'Brien	3.30	347	356						
Fine Gael	Michael Woods	3.10	326							
Electorate: 18,649 Valid: 10,516 (56.39%) Spoilt: 164 Quota: 1,753 Turnout: 10,680 (57.27%)

=== Dundalk South ===
Dundalk South - 6 seats
Party	Candidate	FPv%	Count									
Party	Candidate	FPv%	1	2	3	4	5	6	7	8	9	10
Sinn Féin	Tomás Sharkey*	19.43	2,236									
Fine Gael	Jim D'Arcy*	16.63	1,914									
Independent	Martin Bellew*	12.56	1,456	1,582	1,608	1,632	1,708					
Green	Mark Dearey	12.58	1,448	1,555	1,601	1,635	1,680					
Fianna Fáil	Declan Breathnach*	11.87	1,366	1,423	1,438	1,532	1,543	1,578	1,584			
Fianna Fáil	Donal Lynch*	8.46	974	1,005	1,048	1,136	1,148	1,180	1,180	1,182	1,258	1,265
Fine Gael	Benedicta Attoh	5.09	586	629	728	741	772	891	900	905		
Independent	Alan Grehan	4.82	555	631	649	666	719	899	929	944	1,235	1,269
Labour	Ciaran O Mathúna	3.88	446	492	510	519	569					
Fianna Fáil	Frances Rocks	2.49	286	309	314							
Workers' Party	Peter Short	2.09	241	317	321	330						
Electorate: 20,476 Valid: 11,508 (56.20%) Spoilt: 172 Quota: 1,645 Turnout: 11,680 (57.04%)
