= 2004 Louth County Council election =

Part of the 2004 Irish local elections

- 11 June 2004

All 26 seats on Louth County Council
	First party	Second party	Third party
Party	Fianna Fáil	Fine Gael	Sinn Féin
Seats won	9	7	5
Seat change	-5	-	+4
	Fourth party	Fifth party
Party	Labour	Independent
Seats won	1	4
Seat change	-	+1
- Map showing the area of Louth County Council
Council control after election
TBD

An election to Louth County Council took place on 11 June 2004 as part of that year's Irish local elections. 26 councillors were elected from five local electoral areas (LEAs) for a five-year term of office on the electoral system of proportional representation by means of the single transferable vote (PR-STV).

== Results by party ==
Party	Seats	±	First Pref. votes	FPv%	±%
Fianna Fáil	9	-5	14,110	29.70	-10.44
Fine Gael	7	-	11,103	23.37	-2.6
Sinn Féin	5	+4	8,029	16.90	+7.34
Labour	1	-	2,221	4.67	-2.62
Green	0	0	2,239	4.71	+1.17
Progressive Democrats	0	0	1,860	3.91	+1.87
Independent	4	+1	7,995	16.83	+6.01
Totals	26	-	47,363	100.00	—

== Results by local electoral area ==
=== Ardee ===
Ardee - 5 seats
Party	Candidate	FPv%	Count								
Party	Candidate	FPv%	1	2	3	4	5	6	7	8	9
Sinn Féin	Pearse McGeough	15.54	1,425	1,459	1,483	1,504	1,594				
Fine Gael	Jim Lennon*	14.41	1,321	1,337	1,353	1,425	1,603				
Fianna Fáil	Thomas Clare*	11.52	1,056	1,062	1,167	1,222	1,279	1,287	1,297	1,433	1,510
Fianna Fáil	Tommy Reilly*	10.97	1,006	1,015	1,041	1,047	1,100	1,108	1,123	1,284	1,326
Fine Gael	Finnan McCoy*	9.99	916	955	966	1,014	1,144	1,195	1,210	1,298	1,516
Independent	Jim Tenanty	9.18	842	887	895	911	928	929	932	1,059	1,312
Fianna Fáil	Padraig McKenny	6.36	583	598	644	654	662	663	663		
Progressive Democrats	Leonard Hatrick	6.23	571	621	640	668	682	687	694	775	
Fine Gael	Thomas McGrory	5.77	529	534	566	622					
Fianna Fáil	Benny Devlin	3.46	317	326							
Fine Gael	Gerry Crilly	3.32	304	327	346						
Labour	Gerry Halpenny	3.25	298								
Electorate: 15,926 Valid: 9,126 (57.57%) Spoilt: 244 Quota: 1,529 Turnout: 9,412 (59.10%)

=== Drogheda East ===
Drogheda East - 5 seats
Party	Candidate	FPv%	Count								
Party	Candidate	FPv%	1	2	3	4	5	6	7	8	9
Fine Gael	Oliver Tully*	14.31	1,382	1,456	1,483	1,530	1,623				
Fine Gael	Michael O'Dowd*	13.98	1,350	1,429	1,484	1,515	1,657				
Fianna Fáil	Jimmy Mulroy*	12.08	1,167	1,221	1,485	1,516	1,585	1,594	1,839		
Fianna Fáil	Jacqui McConville*	9.33	901	957	1,015	1,077	1,167	1,175	1,269	1,326	1,330
Labour	Michael Bell	8.77	847	872	905	959	1,042	1,055	1,264	1,317	1,322
Independent	Frank Godfrey*	8.26	798	841	897	945	1,026	1,039			
Sinn Féin	Imelda Munster	7.62	736	752	771	1,085	1,187	1,191	1,331	1,346	1,350
Green	Bernadette Martin	7.07	683	760	786	830					
Sinn Féin	Tom Cunningham	6.95	671	694	707						
Fianna Fáil	Tommy Murphy	6.06	585	610							
Progressive Democrats	Mark Markey	4.74	458								
Progressive Democrats	Peter O'Reilly	0.83	80								
Electorate: 19,204 Valid: 9,658 (50.29%) Spoilt: 263 Quota: 1,610 Turnout: 9,921 (51.66%)

=== Drogheda West ===
Drogheda West - 4 seats
Party	Candidate	FPv%	Count									
Party	Candidate	FPv%	1	2	3	4	5	6	7	8	9	10
Sinn Féin	Matthew Coogan	12.04	853	867	881	904	921	955	978	1,037	1,075	1,090
Independent	Ken O'Heiligh	11.85	839	851	894	926	939	990	1,087	1,177	1,292	1,312
Fine Gael	Anthony Donohoe	10.86	769	785	805	835	1,030	1,069	1,109	1,223	1,342	1,382
Fianna Fáil	Frank Maher	10.79	764	867	910	924	940	1,004	1,055	1,157	1,513	
Labour	Gerald Nash*	10.50	744	749	779	834	881	952	1,046	1,105	1,167	1,188
Fianna Fáil	Maria Campbell-O'Brien*	8.40	595	634	666	697	722	757	827	926		
Independent	Malachy Godfrey	6.40	453	463	491	513	533	579				
Independent	Tommy Byrne	6.31	447	463	497	531	553	594	660			
Fine Gael	Ray Foley*	5.51	390	393	401	411						
Progressive Democrats	Cormac Bohan	5.29	375	391	402	426	453					
Green	Michael McKeon	4.35	308	315	319							
Independent	Seán Collins*	3.94	279	290								
Fianna Fáil	John Branigan	3.77	267									
Electorate: 12,959 Valid: 7,083 (54.66%) Spoilt: 171 Quota: 1,417 Turnout: 7,254 (55.98%)

=== Dundalk-Carlingford ===
Dundalk-Carlingford - 6 seats
Party	Candidate	FPv%	Count									
Party	Candidate	FPv%	1	2	3	4	5	6	7	8	9	10
Fianna Fáil	Peter Savage*	13.14	1,452	1,454	1,467	1,469	1,472	1,555	1,590			
Sinn Féin	Tomás Sharkey*	11.90	1,315	1,329	1,377	1,711						
Independent	Jim Ryan	10.37	1,146	1,158	1,200	1,257	1,278	1,312	1,395	1,511	1,546	1,617
Fine Gael	Terry Brennan*	10.32	1,141	1,147	1,250	1,255	1,255	1,462	1,517	1,791		
Sinn Féin	Jim Loughran	8.07	892	902	910	962	1,057	1,111	1,122	1,152	1,159	1,248
Fianna Fáil	Seamus Keelan*	7.03	777	780	800	801	803	835	1,142	1,206	1,236	1,585
Fianna Fáil	Andreas O'Donnell*	6.43	711	711	760	766	767	791	838	866	880	
Green	Neil McCann	5.96	659	691	732	744	747	774	817	926	992	1,059
Fianna Fáil	Seamus Byrne*	5.75	635	635	648	658	661	674				
Fine Gael	Johnny McGahon	5.49	607	612	666	675	679	762	797			
Fine Gael	Pat Keenan	5.11	565	573	629	633	633					
Sinn Féin	Harry Todd	4.93	545	547	552							
Fine Gael	John Reilly	2.53	280	284								
Progressive Democrats	Seán Marmion	1.93	213	216								
Labour	Des McKeown	1.03	114									
Electorate: 18,578 Valid: 11,052 (59.49%) Spoilt: 286 Quota: 1,579 Turnout: 11,338 (61.03%)

=== Dundalk South ===
Dundalk South - 6 seats
Party	Candidate	FPv%	Count						
Party	Candidate	FPv%	1	2	3	4	5	6	7
Sinn Féin	Kevin Meenan	15.02	1,592						
Independent	Dr. Mary Grehan*	13.06	1,384	1,401	1,493	1,662			
Fianna Fáil	Declan Breathnach*	12.95	1,373	1,378	1,443	1,477	1,487	1,487	1,550
Fine Gael	Jim D'Arcy*	12.73	1,349	1,352	1,497	1,551			
Independent	Martin Bellew*	11.53	1,222	1,237	1,300	1,428	1,489	1,499	1,797
Fianna Fáil	Donal Lynch*	10.69	1,133	1,138	1,154	1,177	1,183	1,190	1,299
Fianna Fáil	Noel Lennon*	7.43	788	796	836	873	879	880	942
Green	Liam Kieran	5.59	592	602	664	783	835	853	
Independent	Benedicta Attoh	5.52	585	593	651				
Labour	Jimmy Gollogly	2.06	218	221					
Fine Gael	Anthony Hoey	1.89	200	202					
Progressive Democrats	Jim Cousins	1.54	163	164					
Electorate: 18,504 Valid: 10,599 (57.28%) Spoilt: 188 Quota: 1,515 Turnout: 10,787 (58.30%)
