= 1991 Louth County Council election =

Part of the 1991 Irish local elections

← 1985	27 June 1991	1999 →

All 26 seats on Louth County Council
	First party	Second party	Third party
Party	Fianna Fáil	Fine Gael	Labour
Seats won	12	6	2
Seat change	0	-2	0
	Fourth party	Fifth party	Sixth party
Party	Progressive Democrats	Sinn Féin	Independent
Seats won	2	1	3
Seat change	+2	0	0
- Map showing the area of Louth County Council
Council control after election
TBD

An election to Louth County Council took place on 27 June 1991 as part of that year's Irish local elections. 26 councillors were elected from five local electoral areas (LEAs) for a five-year term of office on the electoral system of proportional representation by means of the single transferable vote (PR-STV). This term was extended twice, first to 1998, then to 1999.

== Results by party ==
Party	Seats	±	First Pref. votes	FPv%	±%
Fianna Fáil	12	0	13,370	37.03	
Fine Gael	6	-2	7,655	21.20	
Labour	2	0	4,346	12.04	
Progressive Democrats	2	+2	1,643	4.55	
Sinn Féin	1	0	2,556	7.08	
Independent	3	0	6,532	18.09	
Totals	26	0	36,103	100.00	—

== Results by local electoral area ==
=== Ardee ===
Ardee - 5 seats
Party	Candidate	FPv%	Count							
Party	Candidate	FPv%	1	2	3	4	5	6	7	8
Fianna Fáil	John McConville*	12.4%	820	821	827	905	938	1,000	1,029	1,072
Fine Gael	Bernard Markey*	12.3%	812	840	853	862	901	928	1,090	1,095
Fianna Fáil	Nicholas McCabe*	11.8%	781	796	812	924	1,160			
Independent	Hugh D. Conlon*	10.5%	692	707	771	852	860	958	1,095	1,097
Fine Gael	Thomas McGrory*	10.2%	672	674	697	725	727	798	859	859
Progressive Democrats	Finnan McCoy	9.3%	613	655	683	689	755	785	890	901
Independent	Dessie Taaffe	8.8%	578	609	655	660	676	708		
Fianna Fáil	Colm Keenan	5.8%	380	392	410	433				
Fianna Fáil	Jimmy McShane	5.2%	344	347	368					
Sinn Féin	Jackie McGahon	5.1%	333	346						
Labour	Terry Butterly	5%	332	339	436	448	455			
Labour	Gerry Halpenny	3.2%	213							
Independent	Josephine Doherty	0.3%	23							
Electorate: 11,626 Valid: 6,593 (56.7%) Spoilt: 69 Quota: 1,099 Turnout: 6,662 (57.3%)

=== Carlingford ===
Carlingford - 3 seats
Party	Candidate	FPv%	Count					
Party	Candidate	FPv%	1	2	3	4	5	6
Fianna Fáil	Miceal O'Donnell*	26%	1,226					
Fine Gael	Terry Brennan*	21%	989	994	1,069	1,139	1,541	
Fianna Fáil	Peter Savage*	16.7%	786	815	878	931	1,033	1,178
Fine Gael	Tommy Elmore	12.6%	592	595	638	680		
Sinn Féin	Arthur Morgan	12.4%	582	587	616	707	803	879
Independent	Peter Mulligan	5.9%	279	281	313			
Progressive Democrats	Don Johnston	5.5%	258	261				
Electorate: 7,253 Valid: 4,712 (64.97%) Spoilt: 38 Quota: 1,179 Turnout: 4,750 (65.49%)

=== Drogheda Rural ===
Drogheda Rural - 4 seats
Party	Candidate	FPv%	Count								
Party	Candidate	FPv%	1	2	3	4	5	6	7	8	9
Labour	Michael Bell TD*	25.8%	1,309								
Fianna Fáil	Jimmy Mulroy*	18.9%	958	1,003	1,056						
Fine Gael	Oliver Tully	8.7%	443	459	480	483	618	632	652	708	1,016
Fianna Fáil	Michael Coyle	7.8%	397	411	442	455	466	497	615	654	715
Fianna Fáil	Frank Godfrey	7.1%	358	387	411	423	437	504	621	714	782
Fianna Fáil	Eamon Taaffe	6.3%	317	321	341	344	360	364			
Fine Gael	Patrick Carr	6%	306	330	341	344	443	500	515	577	
Fine Gael	Daniel Woods	5.7%	291	300	311	312					
Independent	June Carroll-Holcroft	5.4%	272	285	328	332	344	393	424		
Independent	Tomas O hEochaidh	4.8%	245	254							
Labour	Pat Burke	3.3%	169	301	318	321	328				
Electorate: 9,865 Valid: 5,065 (51.34%) Spoilt: 62 Quota: 1,014 Turnout: 5,127 (51.97%)

=== Drogheda Urban ===
Drogheda Urban - 4 seats
Party	Candidate	FPv%	Count												
Party	Candidate	FPv%	1	2	3	4	5	6	7	8	9	10	11	12	13
Labour	Betty Bell	17.7%	989	994	1,025	1,040	1,071	1,080	1,112	1,150					
Fianna Fáil	Tommy Murphy*	12.4%	689	698	702	706	721	769	795	819	879	1,080	1,188		
Labour	Patsy Kirwan	9.1%	510	516	542	553	561	570	588	605	642	692			
Fine Gael	Fergus O'Dowd*	8.3%	461	467	469	484	505	520	563	702	751	817	894	903	913
Independent	Tommy Byrne	8.2%	456	461	470	488	506	516	563	651	707	753	864	886	897
Fianna Fáil	Con O'Brien	8%	448	448	450	453	457	561	591	604	645	773	893	933	936
Fianna Fáil	Sean Collins	7.6%	422	425	430	433	442	489	517	530	569				
Sinn Féin	Ken O'Heiligh	6.7%	372	382	384	387	415	418	434	442					
Fine Gael	Eugene Byrne	5.7%	317	319	328	347	352	354	362						
Fianna Fáil	Matt Nolan	4.5%	251	253	255	256	257								
Independent	Finian Brannigan	4.3%	242	244	247	255	265	270							
Independent	Donnchadha MacRagnaill	2.7%	149	156	158	164									
Progressive Democrats	Rosemary Coyle	2%	113	114	119										
Labour	Joe Shields	1.7%	97	99											
Independent	John Reilly	1.1%	62												
Electorate: 10,615 Valid: 5,579 (52.56%) Spoilt: 71 Quota: 1,116 Turnout: 5,639 (53.12%)

=== Dundalk Rural ===
Dundalk Rural - 5 seats
Party	Candidate	FPv%	Count								
Party	Candidate	FPv%	1	2	3	4	5	6	7	8	9
Fianna Fáil	Dermot Ahern TD*	21.2%	1,550								
Fianna Fáil	Declan Breathnach	12%	875	982	1,023	1,063	1,095	1,152	1,355		
Fine Gael	Jim Lennon*	11.1%	807	815	819	915	1,009	1,066	1,084	1,087	1,133
Progressive Democrats	Jim Cousins	9%	659	684	697	718	807	951	1,048	1,068	1,088
Sinn Féin	Frank Duffy	8.2%	602	618	639	645	668	709	729	734	
Fianna Fáil	Tommy Reilly	7.8%	571	590	606	644	652	664	789	895	971
Fine Gael	John McGuinness*	7.3%	530	589	601	620	710	784	828	832	887
Fianna Fáil	Jimmy McEvoy	6.1%	448	481	536	545	560	582			
Labour	Frank Carney	5.8%	422	432	446	473	503				
Fine Gael	Stephen Burns	4.9%	358	373	384	394					
Independent	Dessie Taaffe	3.9%	286	289	319						
Fianna Fáil	Paddy Kenny	2.1%	150	185							
Independent	Josephine Doherty	0.6%	42	44							
Electorate: 13,563 Valid: 7,300 (53.82%) Spoilt: 76 Quota: 1,217 Turnout: 7,376 (54.38%)

=== Dundalk Urban ===
Dundalk Urban - 5 seats
Party	Candidate	FPv%	Count												
Party	Candidate	FPv%	1	2	3	4	5	6	7	8	9	10	11	12	13
Independent	Thomas Bellew*	18.9%	1,295												
Fianna Fáil	Seamus Keelan*	11%	753	766	775	843	847	851	873	902	1,015	1,069	1,113	1,423	
Fine Gael	Conor McGahon	9.9%	680	694	745	759	784	820	938	967	996	1,072	1,153		
Sinn Féin	Seán Kenna	9.7%	667	675	676	686	729	749	757	829	839	857	898	923	940
Independent	Neil McCann*	7%	482	500	524	535	549	581	610	626	659	711	786	865	919
Independent	Martin Bellew	6.1%	419	440	447	454	478	504	537	640	658	749	838	899	945
Fianna Fáil	Noel Lennon	5%	344	349	353	383	391	405	414	418	544	592	623		
Independent	Jimmy Callan	4.5%	308	324	329	331	362	374	388	412	435				
Labour	Patrick Brennan	4.4%	305	315	319	320	326	382	406	434	446	471			
Fianna Fáil	Pearse O'Hanrahan	4.4%	304	310	310	346	357	367	373	381					
Independent	Paddy Bellew	3.9%	266	283	285	289	299	318	350						
Fine Gael	John Carroll	3.7%	253	259	299	302	304	317							
Workers' Party	Peter Short	3.5%	237	241	242	247	259								
Republican Sinn Féin	Paddy Kerr	2.9%	199	203	204	207									
Fianna Fáil	Derek Watters	2.9%	198	202	202										
Fine Gael	Joe Gallagher	2.1%	144	150											
Electorate: 12,373 Valid: 6,854 (55.39%) Spoilt: 64 Quota: 1,143 Turnout: 6,918 (55.91%)
