= 2014 Louth County Council election =

Part of the 2014 Irish local elections

- 23 May 2014

All 29 seats on Louth County Council
	First party	Second party	Third party
Party	Sinn Féin	Fine Gael	Fianna Fáil
Seats won	10	7	5
Seat change	+5	-1	-
	Fourth party	Fifth party
Party	Labour	Green
Seats won	2	2
Seat change	-	+1
Party			Independent
Seats won			3
Seat change			-2
- Map showing the area of Louth County Council
Council control after election
TBD

An election to all 29 seats on Louth County Council took place on 23 May 2014 as part of the 2014 Irish local elections, an increase from 26 seats at the 2009 election. County Louth was divided into four local electoral areas (LEAs) to elect councillors for a five-year term of office on the electoral system of proportional representation by means of the single transferable vote (PR-STV).

== Administrative changes ==
Ahead of the 2014 election Louth was redrawn into four electoral areas, a reduction of one from five, and the number of councillors was increased to 29, from a previous total of 26. The borough council of Drogheda and the town councils of Dundalk and Ardee were all abolished.

== Results by party ==
Party	Seats	±	1st pref	FPv%	±%
Sinn Féin	10	+5	14,159	31.42	
Fine Gael	7	-1	9,319	20.68	
Fianna Fáil	5	-	8,576	19.03	
Labour	2	-	2,238	4.96	
Green	2	+1	1,738	3.85	
Independent	3	-2	7,435	16.50	
Direct Democracy	-	-	860	1.90	
Anti-Austerity Alliance	-	-	456	1.01	
People Before Profit	-	-	277	0.16	
Total	29	+3	45,058	100.00	—

== Results by local electoral area ==
*: Outgoing councillor.

=== Ardee ===
Ardee: 6 seats
Party	Candidate	FPv%	Count														
Party	Candidate	FPv%	1	2	3	4	5	6	7	8	9	10	11	12	13	14	15
Sinn Féin	Pearse McGeough	14.54	1,569														
Fine Gael	Colm Markey	11.67	1,258	1,259	1,266	1,288	1,304	1,312	1,314	1,369	1,435	1,465	1,645				
Sinn Féin	Tom Cunningham	10.27	1,107	1,122	1,140	1,149	1,154	1,185	1,196	1,210	1,260	1,316	1,410	1,416	1,443	1,506	1,514
Fianna Fáil	Liam Reilly	8.99	969	972	974	979	986	995	1,001	1,022	1,182	1,218	1,270	1,285	1,441	1,683	
Fine Gael	Jim Lennon	6.22	671	672	674	685	699	706	720	755	763	775	793	807			
Independent	Hugh D. Conlon	5.83	628	629	652	658	679	737	760	771	794	869	1,052	1,097	1,137	1,173	1,193
Fianna Fáil	Fintan Malone	5.67	611	611	614	616	621	636	662	701	764	809	828	831	878		
Independent	Jim Levins	5.56	599	601	614	624	631	638	646	651	694	737					
Fine Gael	Dolores Minogue	4.88	526	527	528	545	565	581	605	753	771	864	879	895	1,154	1,331	1,353
Independent	Jim Tenanty	4.84	522	523	527	529	556	587	725	804	807	902	947	952	1,004	1,174	1,216
Fianna Fáil	Tomás Wilkinson	4.52	487	487	487	496	498	499	500	512							
Fine Gael	Finnan McCoy	4.19	452	453	454	459	470	475	487								
Independent	Berenice McKeever	4.01	431	432	442	451	478	512	527	563	589						
Independent	Michael Farrelly	2.44	263	263	264	269	279	301									
Independent	Kevin Bailey	2.34	252	253	265	269	274										
Independent	Fred Matthews	1.67	180	180	189	191											
Labour	Gavin Kierans	1.22	132	134	134												
Direct Democracy	Pat Greene	1.15	124	124													
Electorate: 21,455 Valid: 10,781 (50.25%) Spoilt: 159 Quota: 1,541 Turnout: 10,940 (50.99%)

=== Drogheda ===
Drogheda: 10 seats
Party	Candidate	FPv%	Count														
Party	Candidate	FPv%	1	2	3	4	5	6	7	8	9	10	11	12	13	14	15
Sinn Féin	Imelda Munster	16.70	2,317														
Labour	Paul Bell	10.17	1,411														
Sinn Féin	Alan Cassidy	8.56	1,188	1,521													
Fianna Fáil	Tommy Byrne	7.22	1,001	1,026	1,029	1,042	1,045	1,045	1,051	1,060	1,162	1,190	1,201	1,266			
Fine Gael	Kevin Callan	6.14	852	874	880	896	897	901	909	928	950	1,000	1,006	1,096	1,109	1,111	1,200
Fine Gael	Oliver Tully	5.29	734	743	745	747	748	750	761	773	792	854	857	982	991	991	1,032
Independent	Frank Godfrey	5.16	716	764	769	788	806	839	872	890	921	949	994	1,031	1,127	1,150	1,289
Fine Gael	Richie Culhane	5.03	698	709	710	723	723	727	733	743	761	793	803	903	929	932	1,028
Labour	Pio Martin Smith	5.01	695	722	725	753	760	764	769	799	810	838	841	870	917	920	987
Fianna Fáil	Frank Maher	4.59	637	652	653	664	670	677	678	695	804	830	843	876	895	900	
Sinn Féin	Kenneth Flood	3.62	502	890	1,099	1,108	1,110	1,121	1,135	1,150	1,167	1,178	1,227	1,246	1,364		
Anti-Austerity Alliance	Ciaran McKenna	3.29	456	490	493	496	499	511	546	579	595	607	677	689			
Fine Gael	Michael O'Dowd	3.12	433	442	444	449	452	453	455	465	474						
Fine Gael	Garrett O'Dowd	3.04	422	436	438	445	446	447	451	461	477	618	625				
Fianna Fáil	John Govern	3.00	416	427	431	435	435	438	442	449							
Direct Democracy	Anthony Connor	2.76	383	410	418	424	434	444	461	472	483	488					
Direct Democracy	Ronan Mooney	2.54	353	397	400	404	413	420	461	485	502	508	707	722	895	921	953
Green	Michael McKeon	1.78	244	255	257	260	264	270	285								
People Before Profit	Stephanie Valla-Black	1.29	179	197	199	201	223	244									
Independent	Julia Feely	0.87	120	126	128	131	152										
Independent	Jeff Rudd	0.81	112	118	119	120											
Electorate: 30,794 Valid: 13,872 (45.05%) Spoilt: 273 Quota: 1,262 Turnout: 14,145 (45.93%)

=== Dundalk Carlingford ===
Dundalk Carlingford: 6 seats
Party	Candidate	FPv%	Count								
Party	Candidate	FPv%	1	2	3	4	5	6	7	8	9
Sinn Féin	Edel Corrigan	15.96	1,564								
Sinn Féin	Jim Loughran	12.80	1,255	1,326	1,349	1,362	1,387	1,399	1,402		
Fianna Fáil	Peter Savage	12.64	1,239	1,241	1,253	1,273	1,368	1,424			
Sinn Féin	J.J. Quigley	7.93	777	836	870	889	897	974	974	1,101	1,150
Fine Gael	John McGahon	7.77	762	765	774	799	877	932	936	1,010	1,381
Fianna Fáil	Conor Keelan	7.52	737	740	743	775	786	952	961	1,074	1,154
Fine Gael	Colin Goss	7.51	736	738	747	764	860	887	887	931	
Green	Mark Dearey	7.31	717	725	765	821	846	902	906	1,079	1,262
Independent	Jim Ryan	5.48	537	541	579	690	702	769	772		
Fianna Fáil	Seán Kelly	5.41	530	534	534	558	562				
Fine Gael	Martin Murnaghan	3.88	380	380	385	389					
Independent	Eamonn P. O'Boyle	3.07	301	303	364						
Independent	Luke Martin	1.01	99	101							
People Before Profit	Syd Smith	0.99	98	99							
Independent	Sylwia Golbiewska Jokubas	0.72	71	73							
Electorate: 19,299 Valid: 9,806 Spoilt: 178 Quota: 1,401 Turnout: 9,984 (52%)

=== Dundalk South ===
Dundalk South: 7 seats
Party	Candidate	FPv%	Count									
Party	Candidate	FPv%	1	2	3	4	5	6	7	8	9	10
Sinn Féin	Tomás Sharkey	17.03	1,805									
Fianna Fáil	Declan Breathnach	12.87	1,364									
Independent	Meave Anna Yore	11.58	1,228	1,260	1,263	1,309	1,389					
Sinn Féin	Kevin Meenan	10.21	1,082	1,246	1,247	1,270	1,281	1,284	1,288	1,307	1,325	1,369
Sinn Féin	Jennifer Green	9.36	992	1,191	1,193	1,212	1,233	1,236	1,247	1,269	1,291	1,350
Green	Marianne Butler	7.33	777	789	792	814	847	856	882	943	987	1,149
Fine Gael	Maria Doyle	6.01	637	647	650	655	678	680	785	838	1,103	1,181
Fianna Fáil	Stephen Egan	5.52	585	600	616	622	644	648	691	766	866	974
Independent	Seán Bellew	4.46	473	482	485	511	552	569	595	712	740	
Fine Gael	Linus English	3.82	405	413	415	417	431	434	524	574		
Independent	Brian O'Neill	3.54	375	382	383	400	454	464	511			
Fine Gael	Paddy Malone	3.32	352	358	359	359	382	390				
Independent	Eamonn P. O'Boyle	2.87	304	312	314	352						
Independent	Oliver Morgan	1.08	114	119	120							
Independent	Mark Fitzsimons	1.03	109	113	113							
Electorate: 21,322 Valid: 10,602 (49.72%) Spoilt: 160 Quota: 1,326 Turnout: 10,762 (50.47%)

== Changes ==
=== Co-options ===
Party	Outgoing	LEA	Reason	Date	Co-optee
Sinn Féin	Imelda Munster	Drogheda	Elected to the 32nd Dáil at the 2016 general election.	21 March 2016	Joanna Byrne
Fianna Fáil	Declan Breathnach	Dundalk South	Elected to the 32nd Dáil at the 2016 general election.	21 March 2016	Emma Coffey
Sinn Féin	Jim Loughran	Dundalk-Carlingford	Retirement.	18 October 2016	Antóin Watters
Sinn Féin	Alan Cassidy	Drogheda	Resigned due to Family reasons.	12 May 2017	David Saurin
Sinn Féin	Kevin Meenan	Dundalk South	Health reasons.	18 September 2017	Ruairí Ó Murchú
Sinn Féin	Jennifer Green	Dundalk South	Resigned due to Family reasons.	18 September 2017	Anne Campbell

=== Changes in affiliation ===
Name	LEA	Elected as	New affiliation	Date
Kevin Callan	Drogheda	Fine Gael	Independent	2 November 2014
