= 1999 Louth County Council election =

Part of the 1999 Irish local elections

- 10 June 1999

All 26 seats to Louth County Council
	First party	Second party	Third party
Party	Fianna Fáil	Fine Gael	Sinn Féin
Seats won	14	7	1
Seat change	+2	+1	0
	Fourth party	Fifth party	Sixth party
Party	Labour	Independent	Progressive Democrats
Seats won	1	3	0
Seat change	-1	0	-2
- Map showing the area of Louth County Council
Council control after election
Fianna Fail

An election to Louth County Council took place on 10 June 1999 as part of that year's Irish local elections. 26 councillors were elected from five local electoral areas for a five-year term of office on the system of proportional representation by means of the single transferable vote (PR-STV).

== Results by party ==
Party	Seats	±	First Pref. votes	FPv%	±%
Fianna Fáil	14	+2	14,166	40.14	
Fine Gael	7	+1	9,167	25.97	
Sinn Féin	1	0	3,373	9.56	
Labour	1	-1	2,573	7.29	
Green	0	0	1,249	3.54	
Progressive Democrats	0	-2	721	2.04	
Workers' Party	0	0	197	0.56	N/a
Independent	3	0	3,818	10.82	
Totals	26	0	35,294	100.00	—

== Results by local electoral area ==
=== Ardee ===
Ardee - 5 seats
Party	Candidate	FPv%	Count									
Party	Candidate	FPv%	1	2	3	4	5	6	7	8	9	10
Fine Gael	Jim Lennon*	14.03	969	972	1,018	1,041	1,066	1,113	1,126	1,324		
Fianna Fáil	Tommy Reilly*	13.89	959	962	967	971	975	1,014	1,075	1,160		
Fianna Fáil	Thomas Clare	10.22	706	713	723	728	737	767	796	862	877	961
Fianna Fáil	Nicholas McCabe*	9.20	635	636	661	692	706	735	756	793	803	1,051
Fine Gael	Finnan McCoy*	8.85	611	613	640	685	750	785	826	903	980	1,173
Independent	Hugh D. Conlon*	8.37	578	595	619	632	649	696	740	820	855	884
Fine Gael	Thomas McGrory	7.60	525	526	545	550	556	580	634			
Fianna Fáil	Padraig McKenny	7.46	515	516	523	562	599	636	674	693	695	
Sinn Féin	Pearse McGeough	5.40	373	377	378	387	401	427				
Green	Neil McCann	4.58	316	322	327	351	388					
Progressive Democrats	Leonard Hatrick	3.40	235	236	240							
Labour	Gerry Halpenny	3.16	218	242	246	271						
Fine Gael	Jeremiah McCarthy	2.77	191	192								
Labour	Donnchadha MacRaghnaill	1.07	74									
Electorate: 14,138 Valid: 6,905 (48.84%) Spoilt: 104 Quota: 1,151 Turnout: 7,009 (49.58%)

=== Drogheda East ===
Drogheda East - 5 seats
Party	Candidate	FPv%	Count									
Party	Candidate	FPv%	1	2	3	4	5	6	7	8	9	10
Fine Gael	Oliver Tully*	12.40	869	876	884	922	941	1,065	1,083	1,108	1,163	1,180
Fianna Fáil	Jimmy Mulroy*	10.46	733	746	772	793	822	849	911	1,136	1,330	
Independent	Frank Godfrey*	10.16	712	737	798	845	901	936	1,016	1,113	1,208	
Fianna Fáil	Jacqui McConville	9.66	677	683	696	735	749	800	830	866	1,033	1,094
Fine Gael	Michael O'Dowd	7.99	560	582	630	673	708	854	888	966	1,012	1,038
Fianna Fáil	Tommy Murphy*	7.76	544	555	562	568	584	591	632			
Fianna Fáil	Michael Coyle	7.63	535	542	563	574	602	616	658	721		
Sinn Féin	Maeve Healy	6.11	428	438	448	464	494	509				
Labour	Tommy Moore	6.06	425	436	448	483	607	625	692	756	813	823
Fine Gael	Christopher Douglas	5.92	415	418	427	449	466					
Labour	Finian Branigan	4.95	347	351	382	412						
Green	Bernadette Martin	4.28	300	331	356							
Independent	Tommy Byrne	4.02	282	294								
Independent	Sheila Martin	2.58	181									
Electorate: 15,991 Valid: 7,008 (43.82%) Spoilt: 91 Quota: 1,169 Turnout: 7,099 (44.39%)

=== Drogheda West ===
Drogheda West - 4 seats
Party	Candidate	FPv%	Count								
Party	Candidate	FPv%	1	2	3	4	5	6	7	8	9
Fine Gael	Senator Fergus O'Dowd*	21.92	1,083								
Fianna Fáil	Maria Campbell-O'Brien*	11.17	552	559	573	594	643	672	751	883	973
Fianna Fáil	Seán Collins	10.71	529	536	545	562	582	627	688	867	955
Fianna Fáil	Josie Carolan	8.99	444	444	445	454	472	478	490		
Fine Gael	Eugene Byrne	8.12	401	426	451	459	495	521	545	598	678
Labour	Patsy Kirwan*	8.06	398	410	419	484	526	569	637	655	739
Sinn Féin	Ken O'Heiligh	7.69	380	384	391	404	435	449			
Independent	Malachy Godfrey	6.15	304	311	320	348	380	500	558	589	
Green	Michael McKeon	5.45	269	274	280	300					
Independent	Frank Godfrey	5.38	266	279	289	304	334				
Labour	Gerald Nash	4.43	219	222	226						
Fine Gael	John Clarke	1.92	95								
Electorate: 10,979 Valid: 4,940 (44.99%) Spoilt: 71 Quota: 989 Turnout: 5,011 (45.64%)

=== Dundalk-Carlingford ===
Dundalk-Carlingford - 6 seats
Party	Candidate	FPv%	Count					
Party	Candidate	FPv%	1	2	3	4	5	6
Fianna Fáil	Peter Savage*	17.86	1,578					
Sinn Féin	Arthur Morgan	16.55	1,462					
Fine Gael	Terry Brennan*	11.23	992	1,069	1,090	1,270		
Fianna Fáil	Seamus Keelan*	10.28	908	952	976	1,000	1,065	1,165
Fianna Fáil	Miceal O'Donnell*	9.63	851	970	1,028	1,084	1,127	1,227
Fianna Fáil	Seamus Byrne	9.57	845	867	882	900	1,033	1,152
Fine Gael	Johnny McGahon	8.82	726	740	755	863	987	1,142
Labour	Jackie Callan	5.99	529	532	569	597	682	
Progressive Democrats	Jim Cousins*	5.50	486	491	505	533		
Fine Gael	Pat Keenan	5.17	457	488	503			
Electorate: 17,472 Valid: 8,834 (50.56%) Spoilt: 202 Quota: 1,263 Turnout: 9,036 (51.72%)

=== Dundalk South ===
Dundalk South - 6 seats
Party	Candidate	FPv%	Count								
Party	Candidate	FPv%	1	2	3	4	5	6	7	8	9
Fianna Fáil	Declan Breathnach*	19.02	1,447								
Independent	Martin Bellew*	12.71	967	996	1,039	1,091					
Fine Gael	Jim D'Arcy	10.58	805	835	839	901	983	1,253			
Sinn Féin	Seán Kenna*	9.60	730	747	766	792	819	842	851	893	902
Fianna Fáil	Noel Lennon*	8.49	646	765	781	818	857	923	962	1,225	
Fianna Fáil	Donal Lynch	7.78	592	622	629	673	720	748	758	896	996
Independent	Dr. Mary Grehan	6.94	528	573	582	638	744	819	900	978	1,007
Fianna Fáil	Pearse O'Hanrahan	6.18	470	505	520	547	585	626	653		
Fine Gael	Stephen Burns	6.15	468	496	505	517	579				
Green	Liam Kieran	5.18	394	407	420						
Labour	Constance Short	4.77	363	375	422	486					
Workers' Party	Peter Short	2.59	197	199							
Electorate: 16,367 Valid: 7,607 (46.48%) Spoilt: 104 Quota: 1,087 Turnout: 7,711 (47.11%)
