= 2024 Louth County Council election =

Part of the 2024 Irish local elections

- 7 June 2024

All 29 seats to Louth County Council 15 seats needed for a majority
| | First party | Second party | Third party |
|---|---|---|---|
| Party | Sinn Féin | Fine Gael | Fianna Fáil |
| Last election | 7 | 5 | 7 |
| Seats won | 7 | 6 | 6 |
| Seat change | Steady | ▲1 | ▼1 |
| | Fourth party | Fifth party | Sixth party |
| Party | Labour | Green | Independent |
| Last election | 3 | 1 | 6 |
| Seats won | 2 | 1 | 7 |
| Seat change | ▼1 | Steady | ▲1 |
- Results by Local Electoral Area

An election to all 29 seats on Louth County Council was held on 7 June 2024 as part of the 2024 Irish local elections. County Louth is divided into 5 local electoral areas (LEAs) to elect councillors for a five-year term of office on the electoral system of proportional representation by means of the single transferable vote (PR-STV).

== Retiring incumbents ==
The following councillors were not seeking re-election:

| Constituency | Departing Councillor | Party | Date announced |
|---|---|---|---|
| Dundalk–Carlingford | Edel Corrigan | Sinn Féin | 18 December 2023 |
| Dundalk South | Liam Reilly | Fianna Fáil | 25 October 2023 |
| Dundalk South | Tomás Sharkey | Sinn Féin | 18 December 2023 |

== Results by party ==
| Party | Candidates | Seats | ± | 1st pref | FPv% | ±% |
|---|---|---|---|---|---|---|
| Sinn Féin | 17 | 7 | Steady | 11,222 | 23.59 | ▼0.51 |
| Fine Gael | 11 | 6 | ▲1 | 8,665 | 18.21 | ▼1.91 |
| Fianna Fáil | 8 | 6 | ▼1 | 8,072 | 16.96 | ▼2.55 |
| Labour | 5 | 2 | ▼1 | 3,648 | 7.67 | ▼0.25 |
| Green | 5 | 1 | Steady | 1,570 | 3.30 | ▼3.10 |
| Irish Freedom | 4 | 0 | New | 1,788 | 3.76 | New |
| Aontú | 2 | 0 | New | 636 | 1.34 | New |
| Independent Ireland | 1 | 0 | New | 508 | 1.07 | New |
| People Before Profit | 1 | 0 | Steady | 344 | 0.72 | ▲0.49 |
| The Irish People | 3 | 0 | New | 334 | 0.70 | New |
| Social Democrats | 1 | 0 | New | 310 | 0.65 | New |
| Independent | 19 | 7 | ▲1 | 10,484 | 22.03 | ▲4.26 |
| Total | 77 | 29 | Steady | 47,581 | 100.00 | |

=== Analysis of Results ===
In the Ardee LEA all 6 sitting Councillors retained their seats though Fine Gael ran close for a third seat and geography was a factor as sitting Councillor Bernie Conlon prevailed on the last count. In Drogheda Rural there was no change in party representation though International Boxing Champion, Eric Donovan, outpolled and unseated his fellow running-mate Clogherhead based Cllr Tom Cunningham. In Drogheda Urban Fine Gael regained the seat that they lost at the 2019 Locals at the expense of the Labour Party as co-opted Cllr Emma Cutlip was defeated. In Dundalk South all seats were retained though Independent Ireland pushed hard, following transfers from the Irish Freedom Party, to challenge for the final seat as Cllr Marianne Butler of the Green Party prevailed with transfers. In the Dundalk-Carlingford LEA, Sinn Féin retained their two seats through good internal party transfers after eliminations but there was considerable leakage in the Fianna Fáil vote which was also not well managed among the three sitting Councillors. First time candidate, Independent Ciarán Fisher, was elected at the expense of incumbent Councillor Conor Keelan. This resulted in Fianna Fáil returning with a net loss of one seat and the loss of their then Party Whip on the council.

== Results by LEA ==
*: Outgoing councillor elected in 2019.
†: Outgoing councillor coopted subsequent to the 2019 election.

=== Ardee ===
Ardee: 6 Seats
| Party | Candidate | FPv% | Count | | | | | | | | | | | |
| Party | Candidate | FPv% | 1 | 2 | 3 | 4 | 5 | 6 | 7 | 8 | 9 | 10 | 11 | 12 |
|---|---|---|---|---|---|---|---|---|---|---|---|---|---|---|
| Fine Gael | Paula Butterly | 11.95% | 1,162 | 1,177 | 1,188 | 1,191 | 1,192 | 1,205 | 1,210 | 1,229 | 1,243 | 1,260 | 1,271 | 1,274 |
| Fianna Fáil | John Sheridan | 11.36% | 1,105 | 1,112 | 1,113 | 1,124 | 1,131 | 1,144 | 1,149 | 1,191 | 1,242 | 1,264 | 1,301 | 1,310 |
| Sinn Féin | Pearse McGeough | 10.97% | 1,067 | 1,070 | 1,072 | 1,120 | 1,126 | 1,136 | 1,155 | 1,184 | 1,226 | 1,736 | | |
| Independent | Jim Tenanty | 10.55% | 1,026 | 1,030 | 1,044 | 1,044 | 1,084 | 1,098 | 1,174 | 1,214 | 1,468 | | | |
| Fine Gael | Dolores Minogue | 10.14% | 986 | 992 | 993 | 996 | 1,006 | 1,038 | 1,050 | 1,077 | 1,181 | 1,223 | 1,254 | 1,280 |
| Fine Gael | Rachel Kerley | 10.06% | 978 | 986 | 987 | 990 | 999 | 1,030 | 1,051 | 1,077 | 1,114 | 1,151 | 1,171 | 1,179 |
| Independent | Bernie Conlon | 8.33% | 810 | 816 | 852 | 854 | 889 | 901 | 987 | 1,018 | 1,075 | 1,111 | 1,206 | 1,238 |
| Sinn Féin | Kitty Colbert | 5.84% | 568 | 573 | 576 | 655 | 666 | 683 | 691 | 775 | 805 | | | |
| Independent | Fintan Malone | 5.50% | 535 | 537 | 547 | 549 | 595 | 610 | 682 | 707 | | | | |
| Social Democrats | Niall McCreanor | 3.19% | 310 | 319 | 320 | 325 | 329 | 371 | 383 | | | | | |
| Labour | Katerina Karpenko | 2.84% | 276 | 295 | 295 | 296 | 300 | | | | | | | |
| Independent | Thomas Commins | 2.73% | 265 | 265 | 320 | 320 | 363 | 367 | | | | | | |
| Independent | Peter Farrell | 2.29% | 223 | 224 | 233 | 235 | | | | | | | | |
| Sinn Féin | Phyllis Murphy | 1.69% | 164 | 164 | 166 | | | | | | | | | |
| Independent | Seán Brown | 1.60% | 156 | 158 | | | | | | | | | | |
| Green | Adam Devine | 0.96% | 93 | | | | | | | | | | | |
Electorate: 19,928 Valid: 9,724 Spoilt: 227 Quota: 1,390 Turnout: 9,951 (49.93%)

=== Drogheda Rural ===
Drogheda Rural: 4 Seats
| Party | Candidate | FPv% | Count | | | | | | | | |
| Party | Candidate | FPv% | 1 | 2 | 3 | 4 | 5 | 6 | 7 | 8 | 9 |
|---|---|---|---|---|---|---|---|---|---|---|---|
| Labour | Michelle Hall | 22.28% | 1,426 | | | | | | | | |
| Fine Gael | Anne-Marie Ford | 16.59% | 1,062 | 1,099 | 1,102 | 1,161 | 1,181 | 1,260 | 1,281 | | |
| Independent | Declan Power | 13.40% | 858 | 887 | 900 | 901 | 951 | 986 | 1,085 | 1,289 | |
| Sinn Féin | Eric Donovan | 11.26% | 721 | 732 | 735 | 746 | 760 | 790 | 824 | 859 | 925 |
| Sinn Féin | Tom Cunningham | 10.09% | 646 | 657 | 659 | 668 | 678 | 692 | 727 | 750 | 850 |
| Fianna Fáil | Tomás Wilkinson | 6.69% | 428 | 437 | 438 | 443 | 453 | 494 | 525 | 531 | |
| Irish Freedom | Patrice Johnson | 5.36% | 343 | 345 | 387 | 390 | 403 | 407 | 452 | | |
| Independent | Frank Godfrey | 5.08% | 325 | 337 | 341 | 348 | 365 | 390 | | | |
| Green | Anthony Murphy | 3.73% | 239 | 266 | 267 | 272 | 288 | | | | |
| Independent | Mick Martin | 2.61% | 167 | 170 | 176 | 178 | | | | | |
| Fine Gael | Marian Agrios | 1.64% | 105 | 108 | 109 | | | | | | |
| The Irish People | Derek McElearney | 1.27% | 81 | 82 | | | | | | | |
Electorate: 14,133 Valid: 6,401 Spoilt: 122 Quota: 1,281 Turnout: 6,523 (46.15%)

=== Drogheda Urban ===
Drogheda Urban: 6 Seats
| Party | Candidate | FPv% | Count | | | | | | | | | | | | | | | |
| Party | Candidate | FPv% | 1 | 2 | 3 | 4 | 5 | 6 | 7 | 8 | 9 | 10 | 11 | 12 | 13 | 14 | 15 | 16 |
|---|---|---|---|---|---|---|---|---|---|---|---|---|---|---|---|---|---|---|
| Labour | Pio Smith | 13.06% | 1,195 | 1,197 | 1,201 | 1,208 | 1,232 | 1,236 | 1,243 | 1,246 | 1,399 | | | | | | | |
| Independent | Kevin Callan | 11.83% | 1,082 | 1,095 | 1,098 | 1,121 | 1,130 | 1,157 | 1,160 | 1,173 | 1,195 | 1,208 | 1,222 | 1,258 | 1,337 | | | |
| Sinn Féin | Joanna Byrne | 10.28% | 940 | 942 | 943 | 960 | 971 | 996 | 1,060 | 1,066 | 1,093 | 1,100 | 1,292 | 1,309 | | | | |
| Fianna Fáil | James Byrne | 9.65% | 883 | 885 | 885 | 890 | 902 | 912 | 913 | 914 | 931 | 938 | 944 | 956 | 1,004 | 1,009 | 1,100 | 1,270 |
| Independent | Paddy McQuillan | 8.48% | 776 | 785 | 792 | 815 | 828 | 866 | 875 | 899 | 915 | 931 | 945 | 1,008 | 1,106 | 1,122 | 1,249 | 1,300 |
| Fine Gael | Ejiro O'Hare Stratton | 6.96% | 637 | 640 | 641 | 647 | 664 | 668 | 670 | 672 | 700 | 724 | 732 | 736 | 759 | 761 | 815 | 1,143 |
| Fine Gael | Shóna McManus | 6.32% | 578 | 581 | 582 | 593 | 600 | 602 | 604 | 607 | 620 | 626 | 631 | 637 | 655 | 655 | 681 | |
| Sinn Féin | Debbie McCole | 4.74% | 434 | 436 | 437 | 447 | 452 | 461 | 539 | 546 | 555 | 559 | 632 | 644 | 693 | 696 | 738 | 753 |
| Aontú | Michael O'Dowd | 4.45% | 407 | 414 | 417 | 419 | 425 | 430 | 432 | 446 | 451 | 457 | 470 | 564 | 627 | 631 | | |
| Independent | Frank Godfrey | 3.69% | 338 | 347 | 352 | 358 | 361 | 387 | 388 | 414 | 428 | 432 | 448 | 491 | | | | |
| Sinn Féin | Laura Clinton | 3.33% | 305 | 306 | 307 | 310 | 314 | 322 | 346 | 350 | 362 | 366 | | | | | | |
| Irish Freedom | Patrice Johnson | 3.29% | 301 | 305 | 326 | 328 | 329 | 333 | 333 | 424 | 425 | 426 | 430 | | | | | |
| Labour | Emma Cutlip | 3.04% | 278 | 278 | 279 | 284 | 327 | 334 | 334 | 335 | | | | | | | | |
| Sinn Féin | Joanne Thompson | 2.03% | 186 | 187 | 189 | 199 | 201 | 203 | | | | | | | | | | |
| Independent | John Bannon | 1.98% | 181 | 182 | 182 | 190 | 192 | | | | | | | | | | | |
| The Irish People | Alan Fagan | 1.86% | 170 | 173 | 201 | 204 | 204 | 217 | 220 | | | | | | | | | |
| Green | Michael Kennedy | 1.74% | 159 | 160 | 160 | 163 | | | | | | | | | | | | |
| Independent | Peter James Nugent | 1.62% | 148 | 148 | 151 | | | | | | | | | | | | | |
| The Irish People | John Morgan | 0.91% | 83 | 84 | | | | | | | | | | | | | | |
| Independent | Vincent Hynes | 0.73% | 67 | | | | | | | | | | | | | | | |
Electorate: 19,729 Valid: 9,148 Spoilt: 204 Quota: 1,307 Turnout: 9,352 (47.40%)

=== Dundalk–Carlingford ===
Dundalk–Carlingford: 6 Seats
| Party | Candidate | FPv% | Count | | | | | | | | | | |
| Party | Candidate | FPv% | 1 | 2 | 3 | 4 | 5 | 6 | 7 | 8 | 9 | 10 | 11 |
|---|---|---|---|---|---|---|---|---|---|---|---|---|---|
| Fianna Fáil | Seán Kelly | 17.91% | 1,828 | | | | | | | | | | |
| Sinn Féin | Antóin Watters | 16.88% | 1,723 | | | | | | | | | | |
| Fine Gael | John Reilly | 8.14% | 831 | 862 | 876 | 886 | 910 | 1,084 | 1,092 | 1,224 | 1,245 | 1,260 | 1,275 |
| Fianna Fáil | Andrea McKevitt | 8.04% | 821 | 862 | 912 | 926 | 957 | 1,072 | 1,080 | 1,201 | 1,212 | 1,234 | 1,243 |
| Fianna Fáil | Conor Keelan | 7.75% | 791 | 899 | 906 | 922 | 958 | 992 | 1,009 | 1,070 | 1,097 | 1,142 | 1,172 |
| Independent | Ciarán Fisher | 6.74% | 688 | 742 | 750 | 797 | 849 | 862 | 898 | 978 | 1,331 | 1,412 | 1,518 |
| Sinn Féin | Kathleen Byrne | 5.83% | 595 | 621 | 639 | 649 | 659 | 669 | 855 | 883 | 932 | | |
| Irish Freedom | Tracy O'Hanlon | 5.72% | 584 | 604 | 609 | 682 | 697 | 706 | 721 | 740 | | | |
| Sinn Féin | Fiona Mhic Conchoille | 4.97% | 507 | 517 | 603 | 615 | 628 | 652 | 868 | 943 | 979 | 1,619 | |
| Labour | Jamie O'Hare | 4.63% | 473 | 487 | 504 | 514 | 574 | 613 | 626 | | | | |
| Sinn Féin | Seán Ó Broin | 4.39% | 448 | 477 | 514 | 523 | 537 | 544 | | | | | |
| Fine Gael | Yvonne Keenan Ross | 3.94% | 402 | 409 | 422 | 427 | 460 | | | | | | |
| Green | Gerard Crawley | 2.83% | 289 | 306 | 310 | 318 | | | | | | | |
| Aontú | Liam Reichenberg | 2.24% | 229 | 241 | 246 | | | | | | | | |
Electorate: 20,039 Valid: 10,209 Spoilt: 180 Quota: 1,459 Turnout: 10,389 (51.84%)

=== Dundalk South ===
Dundalk South: 7 Seats
| Party | Candidate | FPv% | Count | | | | | | | | | | |
| Party | Candidate | FPv% | 1 | 2 | 3 | 4 | 5 | 6 | 7 | 8 | 9 | 10 | 11 |
|---|---|---|---|---|---|---|---|---|---|---|---|---|---|
| Independent | Maeve Yore | 17.77% | 2,150 | | | | | | | | | | |
| Fine Gael | Robert Nash | 10.71% | 1,296 | 1,401 | 1,431 | 1,441 | 1,457 | 1,482 | 1,515 | | | | |
| Fianna Fáil | Emma Coffey | 9.60% | 1,161 | 1,256 | 1,290 | 1,305 | 1,368 | 1,381 | 1,403 | 1,572 | | | |
| Fianna Fáil | Shane McGuinness | 8.72% | 1,055 | 1,109 | 1,128 | 1,131 | 1,142 | 1,155 | 1,168 | 1,328 | 1,338 | 1,341 | 1,350 |
| Sinn Féin | Kevin Meenan | 8.07% | 976 | 1,009 | 1,025 | 1,053 | 1,077 | 1,111 | 1,285 | 1,312 | 1,695 | | |
| Green | Marianne Butler | 6.53% | 790 | 873 | 892 | 944 | 1,056 | 1,066 | 1,082 | 1,202 | 1,246 | 1,250 | 1,274 |
| Sinn Féin | Sionainn McCann | 5.88% | 712 | 734 | 760 | 823 | 893 | 904 | 1,122 | 1,163 | 1,481 | 1,652 | |
| Sinn Féin | Jimmy Myers | 5.24% | 634 | 647 | 659 | 666 | 674 | 688 | | | | | |
| Fine Gael | Linus English | 5.19% | 628 | 670 | 698 | 702 | 735 | 738 | 747 | | | | |
| Sinn Féin | Aideen Smith | 4.93% | 596 | 623 | 634 | 677 | 698 | 721 | 854 | 860 | | | |
| Irish Freedom | Cathal Ó Murchú | 4.63% | 560 | 585 | 599 | 614 | 629 | | | | | | |
| Independent Ireland | Barry Kieran | 4.20% | 508 | 555 | 576 | 620 | 670 | 966 | 994 | 1,041 | 1,076 | 1,080 | 1,114 |
| Independent | Seun Grace Atiroko | 3.17% | 383 | 413 | 448 | 517 | | | | | | | |
| People Before Profit | James Hickey | 2.84% | 344 | 368 | 394 | | | | | | | | |
| Independent | Dilip Mahapatra | 2.53% | 306 | 343 | | | | | | | | | |
Electorate: 25,691 Valid: 12,099 Spoilt: 225 Quota: 1,513 Turnout: 12,324 (47.97%)

== Changes after 2024 ==
| Party | Outgoing | LEA | Reason | Date | Co-optee |
|---|---|---|---|---|---|
| Fine Gael | Paula Butterly | Ardee | Elected for Louth to the 34th Dáil at the 2024 general election | 11 December 2024 | Rachel Kerley |
| Sinn Féin | Joanna Byrne | Drogheda Urban | Elected for Louth to the 34th Dáil at the 2024 general election | TBA | TBA |
