= Mark Dearey =

Irish politician (born 1963)

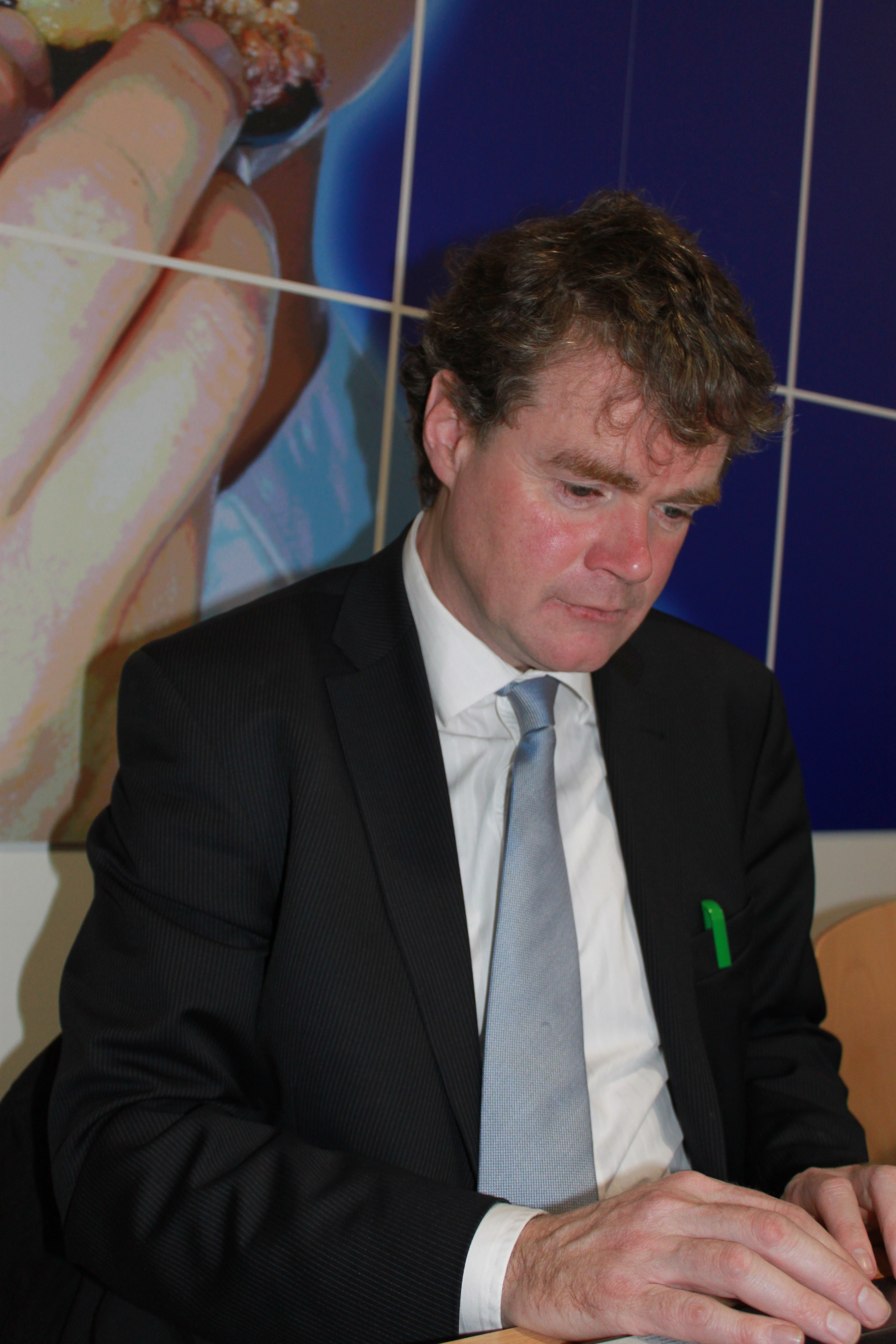

Senator
- In office 23 February 2010 – 25 May 2011
- Constituency: Nominated by the Taoiseach

Personal details
- Born: 19 March 1963 (age 63) Drogheda, County Louth, Ireland
- Party: Green Party
- Spouse: Laura Dearey
- Children: 4
- Education: University College Cork

Mark Dearey (born 19 March 1963) is an Irish Green Party politician who served as a Senator from 2010 to 2011, after being nominated by the Taoiseach.

== Political career ==
Dearey was a member of Louth County Council for the Green Party. He was first elected to the Dundalk Town Council in 2004 for the Dundalk Central Area and was re-elected in 2009 securing a seat on the County Council for the first time on the same day in Dundalk South. He was re-elected to the County Council in 2014 this time for Dundalk-Carlingford by which time he was residing in Omeath.

His sister-in-law, Marianne Butler, remains a Green Party member of Louth County Council.

He was the Green Party candidate at the 2007 general election in the Louth constituency and received 7.6% of first preference votes, but was not elected. In the 2011 general election, his vote declined to 4.7% of first preference votes. In 2012, he was selected as the Green Party's Spokesperson for Finance.

He ran unsuccessfully as the Green Party candidate in the Midlands–North-West constituency for the 2014 European Parliament election and received 1.5% of the first preference votes. He was also an unsuccessful candidate in the Louth constituency at the 2016 general election. He did not contest the 2019 local elections. He contested the 2020 general election for the Green Party in Louth, but was not elected.

== Background ==
He first came to public attention in County Louth in 1994, when he and three others from the county took a court action against British Nuclear Fuels, to seek an end to reprocessing at Sellafield as a member of STAD (Stop Thorpe Alliance Dundalk).

In the early 1990s, he worked as a secondary schoolteacher in Coláiste Éanna in Dublin, before embarking on a career in organic horticulture where he worked for nine years. He then acquired the music venue and bar, The Spirit Store in Dundalk which he still owns and manages.

He is a Director of Turas, a Dundalk based addiction counselling service and was a founding member of the Newry Dundalk Farmers Market and served as Chairman of the Dundalk St. Patrick's Day Committee, the Dundalk BIDS (Dundalk Business Improvement District Scheme) and as a former board member of Friends of the Earth, Ireland.
