= County Hall, Dundalk =

Municipal building in County Louth, Ireland

Coordinates: 54.0042°N 6.3867°W

County Hall is a municipal facility at the Millennium Centre in Dundalk, County Louth, Ireland.

== History ==
The site currently occupied by County Hall was used as a railway goods depot until 1995. Meetings of Louth County Council had previously taken place in Dundalk Courthouse while a home for the county officials was established at County Buildings in Crowe Street. The new building, which formed part of a larger development involving the new County Hall, a leisure and swimming pool complex and some decentralised Government offices, was completed in 2000.
