= Dundalk Courthouse =

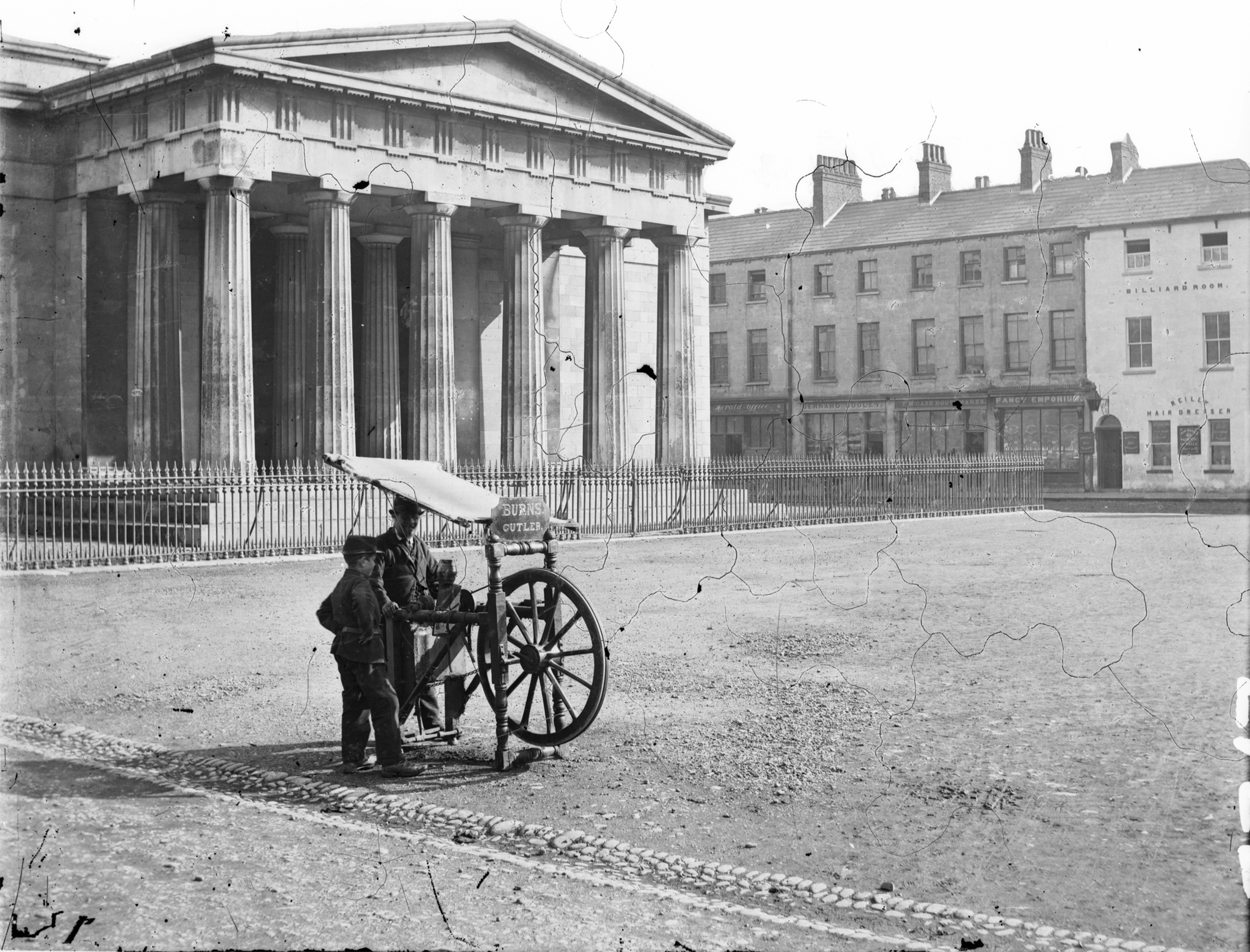
- Dundalk Courthouse

- Location within Ireland

General information
- Architectural style: Neoclassical style
- Location: Magnet Road, Townparks, Dundalk, County Louth, Ireland
- Coordinates: 54.0046°N 6.4012°W
- Completed: 1819

Design and construction
- Architects: Edward Parke and John Bowden

Dundalk Courthouse is a judicial facility in Dundalk, County Louth, Ireland.

== History ==
The courthouse, which was designed by Edward Parke and John Bowden in the neoclassical style and built in ashlar stone, was completed in 1819. The design involved a symmetrical main frontage facing Crowe Street; there was a short flight of steps leading up to a large hexastyle portico with fluted Doric order columns supporting a triglyphed entablature and a pediment. The design was modelled on the Temple of Hephaestus in Athens.

The building was originally used as a facility for dispensing justice but, following the implementation of the Local Government (Ireland) Act 1898, which established county councils in every county, it also became the meeting place for Louth County Council. Meanwhile, a home for the county officials was established at County Buildings in Crowe Street. Both the county council and its officials moved to County Hall in 2000. By then the courthouse had fallen into a state of disrepair and, after an extensive programme of refurbishment works, it was officially re-opened by Michael McDowell, the Minister for Justice, Equality and Reform, in March 2003.
