= Louth County Council =

Local authority of County Louth, Ireland

Louth County Council Comhairle Contae Lú
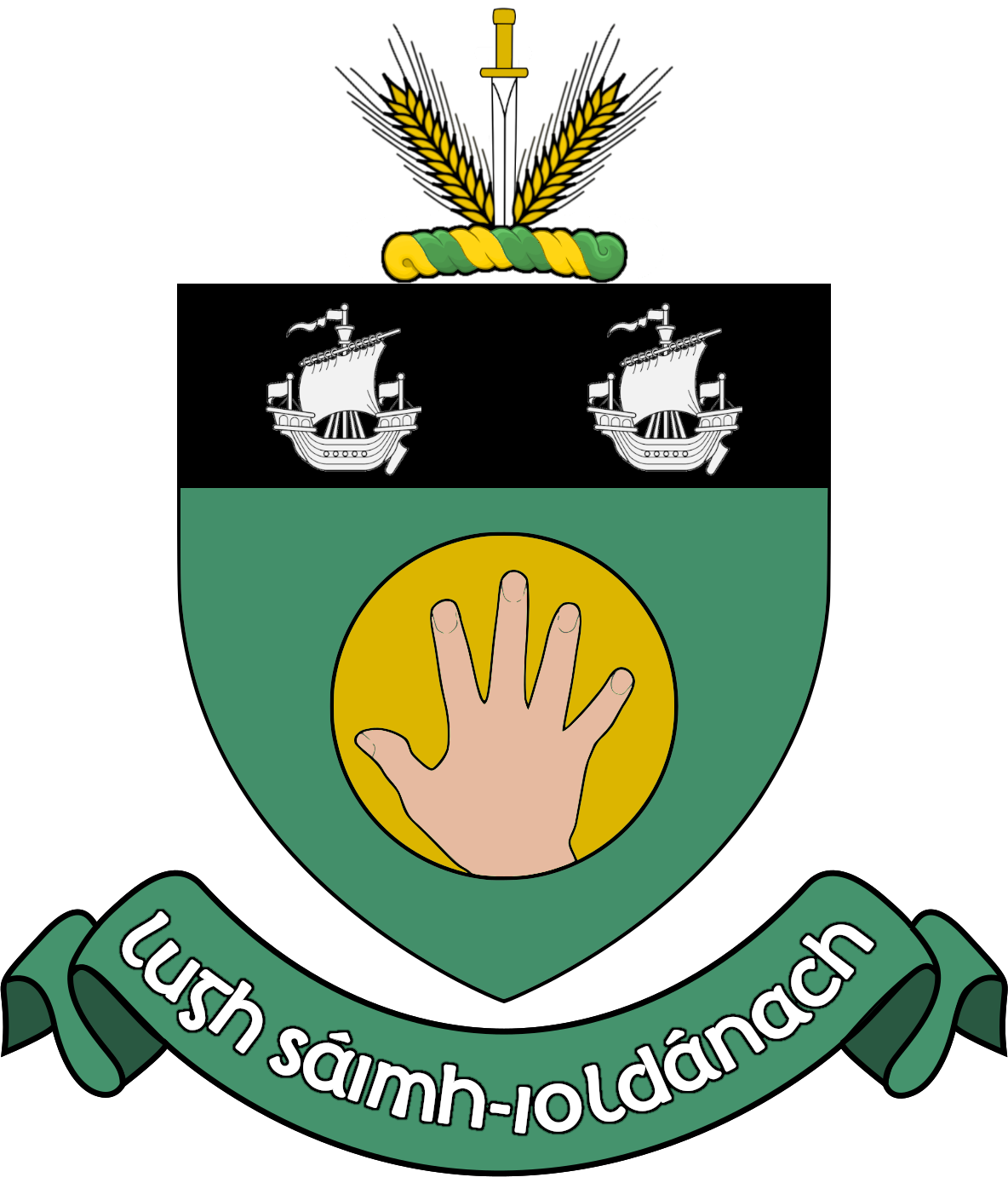

Type
- Type: County council of County Louth

History
- Founded: 1 April 1899

Leadership
- Cathaoirleach: Dolores Minogue, FG

Structure
- Seats: 29
- Political groups: Sinn Féin (7) Fianna Fáil (6) Fine Gael (6) Labour (2) Green (1) Independent (7)

Elections
- Last election: 7 June 2024

Motto
- Irish: Lugh sáimh-ioldánach "Lugh equally skilled in many arts"

Meeting place
- County Hall, Dundalk

Website
- Official website

The area governed by the council

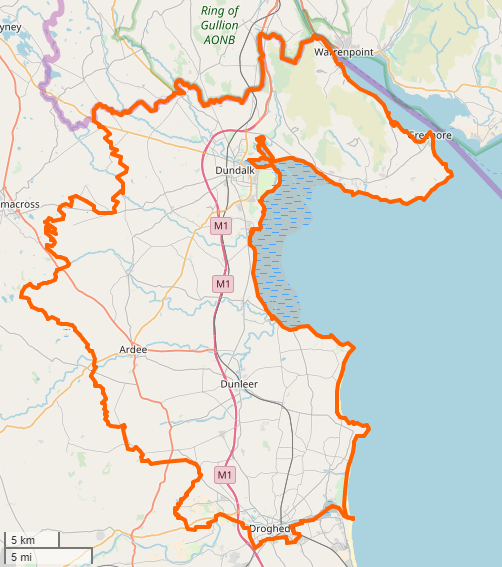
County Louth

Louth County Council (Irish: Comhairle Contae Lú) is the local authority of County Louth, Ireland. As a county council, it is governed by the Local Government Act 2001. The council is responsible for housing and community, roads and transportation, urban planning and development, amenity and culture, and environment. The council has 29 elected members. Elections are held every five years and are by single transferable vote. The head of the council has the title of Cathaoirleach (chairperson). The current Cathaoirleach is Kevin Callan. The county administration is headed by a chief executive, David Conway. The county town is Dundalk.

== History ==
Louth County Council was established on 1 April 1899 under the Local Government (Ireland) Act 1898 for the administrative county of County Louth, succeeding the judicial county of Louth and the judicial county of the town of Drogheda.

Originally meetings of Louth County Council took place in Dundalk Courthouse. A home for the county officials was subsequently established at County Buildings in Crowe Street and both the county council and its officials moved to County Hall in 2000. Up until then administration services in Dundalk were separated into two different buildings, the former Louth Infirmary at The Crescent and in Crowe Street. This rationalisation streamlined services in one building.

Both the crests of Dundalk and County Louth reference the legend of Táin Bó Cúailnge. Louth traces its name from the Celtic god Lú. According to one interpretation of The Táin, Lú's son is the warrior Cú Chulainn, who it is claimed was born in near Dundalk, hence the fates of Dundalk and Louth are always linked together.

== Regional Assembly ==
Louth County Council has two representatives on the Eastern and Midland Regional Assembly who are part of the Eastern Strategic Planning Area Committee.

== Elections ==
The Local Government (Ireland) Act 1919 introduced the electoral system of proportional representation by means of the single transferable vote (PR-STV) for the 1920 Irish local elections. This electoral system has been retained. The 29 members of Louth County Council are elected for a five-year term of office from multi-member local electoral areas (LEAs).

Year	SF	FF	FG	Lab	GP	PDs	Ind.	Total
2024	7	6	6	2	1	—N/a	7	29
2019	7	7	5	3	1	—N/a	6	29
2014	10	5	7	2	2	—N/a	3	29
2009	6	5	8	2	1	—N/a	4	26
2004	5	9	7	1	0	0	4	26
1999	1	14	7	1	0	0	3	26
1991	1	12	6	2	0	2	3	26
1985	1	11	8	2	0	—N/a	3	26

== Local electoral areas and municipal districts ==
County Louth is divided into borough and municipal districts and LEAs, defined by electoral divisions. The municipal district which contains the administrative area of the former borough of Drogheda is referred to as a Borough District.

Councillors have regular monthly meetings both as a whole council and within their municipal district. Each municipal district elects its own chair, titled a Cathaoirleach.

Municipal District	LEA	Definition	Seats
Ardee		Ardee Rural, Ardee Urban, Castlebellingham, Clonkeen, Collon, Darver, Dromin, Drumcar, Dunleer, Dysart, Killanny, Louth, Mansfieldstown, Mullary, Stabannan and Tallanstown	6
Borough District of Drogheda	Drogheda Rural	Clogher, Monasterboice, St. Peter's and Termonfeckin	4
Borough District of Drogheda	Drogheda Urban	Fair Gate, St Lawrence Gate, St. Mary's (part) and West Gate	6
Dundalk	Dundalk—Carlingford	Ballymascanlan, Carlingford, Drummullagh, Dundalk No. 1 Urban, Dundalk No. 2 Urban, Faughart, Greenore, Jenkinstown, Rathcor, Ravensdale; those parts of the electoral divisions of Castletown, Dundalk Rural, Dundalk No. 3 Urban and Dundalk No. 4 Urban not contained in the local electoral area of Dundalk South	6
Dundalk	Dundalk South	Barronstown, Castlering, Creggan Upper, Dromiskin, Haggardstown; those parts of the electoral divisions of Castletown and Dundalk Rural south of the R178 (Carrickmacross Road); and those parts of the electoral divisions of Dundalk No. 3 Urban and Dundalk No. 4 Urban south of a line drawn as follows: Commencing at the boundary between the electoral divisions of Dundalk No. 1 Urban and Dundalk No. 3 Urban at the Carrickmacross Road Bridge and St. Dominick's Place and then proceeding in an easterly direction to the junction of St. Dominick's Place with the roundabout at the Crescent; then proceeding in a clockwise direction around and excluding the said roundabout to its junction with Anne Street; then proceeding in a north-easterly direction along Anne Street to its junction with Park Street; then proceeding in a north easterly direction along Park Street to its junction with Francis Street; then proceeding in a north-easterly direction along Francis Street and Roden Place following the boundary between the electoral divisions of Dundalk No. 1 Urban and Dundalk No. 4 Urban; then proceeding in an easterly direction along Jocelyn Street, Seatown Place and along the road connecting Seatown Place to Barrack Street to reach the junction of said road with the Dundalk Inner Relief Road; then proceeding in a north-westerly projection along the Dundalk Inner Relief Road to its junction with the road at St. Helena; then proceeding along the north-easterly projection of the said road at St. Helena to Dundalk Harbour	7

== Councillors ==
The following were elected at the 2024 Louth County Council election.

=== 2024 seats summary ===
Party	Seats
Sinn Féin	7
Fianna Fáil	6
Fine Gael	6
Labour	2
Green	1
Independent	7

=== Councillors by electoral area ===
This list reflects the order in which councillors were elected on 7 June 2024.

Council members from 2024 election
LEA	Name	Party
Ardee	Jim Tenanty	Independent
Ardee	Pearse McGeough	Sinn Féin
Ardee	Paula Butterly (Note: Replaced during term, see table below for details.)	Fine Gael
Ardee	John Sheridan	Fianna Fáil
Ardee	Dolores Minogue	Fine Gael
Ardee	Bernie Conlon	Independent
Drogheda Rural	Michelle Hall	Labour
Drogheda Rural	Anne-Marie Ford	Fine Gael
Drogheda Rural	Declan Power	Independent
Drogheda Rural	Eric Donovan	Sinn Féin
Drogheda Urban	Pio Smith	Labour
Drogheda Urban	Joanna Byrne	Sinn Féin
Drogheda Urban	Kevin Callan	Independent
Drogheda Urban	James Byrne	Fianna Fáil
Drogheda Urban	Paddy McQuillan	Independent
Drogheda Urban	Ejiro O'Hare Stratton	Fine Gael
Dundalk–Carlingford	Seán Kelly	Fianna Fáil
Dundalk–Carlingford	Antóin Watters	Sinn Féin
Dundalk–Carlingford	Fiona Mhic Conchoille	Sinn Féin
Dundalk–Carlingford	Ciarán Fisher	Independent
Dundalk–Carlingford	John Reilly	Fine Gael
Dundalk–Carlingford	Andrea McKevitt	Fianna Fáil
Dundalk South	Maeve Yore	Independent
Dundalk South	Robert Nash	Fine Gael
Dundalk South	Emma Coffey	Fianna Fáil
Dundalk South	Kevin Meenan	Sinn Féin
Dundalk South	Sionainn McCann	Sinn Féin
Dundalk South	Shane McGuinness	Fianna Fáil
Dundalk South	Marianne Butler	Green

==== Co-options ====
Party	Outgoing	LEA	Reason	Date	Co-optee
Fine Gael	Paula Butterly	Ardee	Elected to 34th Dáil at the 2024 general election	18 December 2024	Rachel Kerley
Sinn Féin	Joanna Byrne	Drogheda Urban	Elected to 34th Dáil at the 2024 general election	18 December 2024	Debbie McCole

== Chief executive ==
Each council has a chief executive, previously known as city or county manager, who is the manager of the local authority.

Year	Title	Name	Next position
2024–present	Chief Executive	David Conway	
2014–2024	Chief executive	Joan Martin	
2013–2014	County Manager	Philomena Poole	County manager for Dún Laoghaire–Rathdown County Council
2012–2013	Acting County Manager	Joan Martin	
2007–2012	County Manager	Conn Murray	City and County Manager for Limerick Council

Each Chief Executive has a Management Team made up of appointed Directors of Service who head specified Directorates. Under a provision of the Local Government Act the elected members must vote confidence in a new chief executive and also have the power to remove one from office. The Cathaoirleach chairs each monthly meeting as well as meetings of the Corporate Policy Group (CPG) some weeks in advance of the agenda being agreed. Members of the CPG Team include the elected chairpersons of each Strategic Policy Committee (SPC), the Directors of Service and the Meetings Administrator. There are five SPC chairpersons in Louth County Council and Directors of Service serve on each with an agreed workplan. There is also an Audit Committee on which two members are elected to serve together with three appointed members, one of whom will be the independent chairperson. The Audit Committee must always remain independent from the council though publishes minutes and an agreed workplan. The LCDC, made up of four elected members, the Chief Executive of the day, several Directors of Service, several staff members and appointed members from various sectoral interests is similar to a SPC in nature, in actual statute, but does not publish or agree its workplan with the elected members or be scrutinised by the Audit Committee despite having a considerable financial budget.

== Cathaoirleach of the council ==
Every year, the local authority elects a chair called the Cathaoirleach (chairperson) for a term of one year and a deputy chair called the Leas-Cathaoirleach from among its members. The members elected for each municipal district elect a Cathaoirleach and a Leas-Chathaoirleach for their grouping. The Cathaoirleach chairs the meetings of the local authority or municipal district. Mayor and Deputy Mayor are titles used in municipal districts which were formerly borough councils. Based on population the Dundalk Municipal District is the largest in the state, comprising 13 elected members, but is not designated as a borough district. Following the 2014 legislation it was an option for Dundalk to be also recognised as a borough district on the equivalent standing as her sister town of Drogheda on the legislation drawn up by then Minister for Local Government John Paul Phelan. Despite requests this was not taken up.

Year	Name	Party
2023–2024	Paula Butterly	Fine Gael
2022–2023	Conor Keelan	Fianna Fáil
2021–2022	Pio Smith	Labour
2020–2021	Dolores Minogue	Fine Gael
2018–2020	Liam Reilly	Fianna Fáil
2017–2018	Colm Markey	Fine Gael
2016–2017	Paul Bell	Labour
2015–2016	Peter Savage (7th)	Fianna Fáil
2014–2015	Oliver Tully (2nd)	Fine Gael
2013–2014	Declan Breathnach (2nd)	Fianna Fáil
2012–2013	Finnan McCoy	Fine Gael
2011–2012	Oliver Tully (1st)	Fine Gael
2010–2011	Peter Savage (6th)	Fianna Fáil
2009–2010	Jim D'Arcy	Fine Gael
2008–2009	Declan Breathnach (1st)	Fianna Fáil
2007–2008	Jimmy Mulroy	Fianna Fáil
2006–2007	Jim Lennon	Fine Gael
2005–2006	Peter Savage (5th)	Fianna Fáil
2004–2005	Terry Brennan	Fine Gael
2003–2004	Nicholas McCabe (8th)	Fianna Fáil
2002–2003	Jacqui McConville	Fianna Fáil
2001–2002	Tommy Reilly (2nd)	Fianna Fáil
2000–2001	Nicholas McCabe (7th)	Fianna Fáil
1999–2000	Peter Savage (4th)	Fianna Fáil
1998–1999	Miċéal O'Donnell (2nd)	Fianna Fáil
1997–1998	Martin Bellew	Independent
1996–1997	Tommy Reilly (1st)	Fianna Fáil
1995–1996	W. Frank Godfrey	Fianna Fáil
1994–1995	Nicholas McCabe (6th)	Fianna Fáil
1993–1994	Jim Cousins	Progressive Democrats
1992–1993	Peter Savage (3rd)	Fianna Fáil
1991–1992	John McConville (2nd)	Fianna Fáil
1990–1991	Miċéal O'Donnell (1st)	Fianna Fáil
1989–1990	Nicholas McCabe (5th)	Fianna Fáil
1988–1989	Peter Savage (2nd)	Fianna Fáil
1986–1988	John McConville (1st)	Fianna Fáil
1985–1986	Peter Savage (1st)	Fianna Fáil
1983–1985	Nicholas McCabe (4th)	Fianna Fáil
1982–1983	Patrick Buckley	Fine Gael
1981–1982	Nicholas McCabe (3rd)	Fianna Fáil
1980–1981	Tommy Elmore	Fine Gael
1979–1980	Nicholas McCabe (2nd)	Fianna Fáil
1976–1979	Peter J. Moore	Labour
1975–1976	Patrick J. O'Hare (2nd)	Fine Gael
1974–1975	Nicholas McCabe (1st)	Fianna Fáil
1973–1974	Patrick J. O'Hare (1st)	Fine Gael
1967–1973	Paddy Donegan	Fine Gael
1960–1967	Bernard Rafferty	Fianna Fáil
1958–1960	William Woods (2nd)	Fine Gael
1957–1958	Laurence Walsh	Fianna Fáil
1955–1957	William Woods (1st)	Fine Gael
1925–1955	James McGee	Fine Gael
1920–1925	James Murphy	Sinn Féin
1918–1920	Patrick McGee	Sinn Féin
1913–1918	William Doran	Irish Nationalist
1899–1913	Peter Hughes	Independent

== Population by local electoral area ==
The table below sets out the population of the county broken down by Local Electoral Area, total 2022 population of 139,703.

LEA	Population (2016)	Population (2022)	Seats	Population per seat
Drogheda Rural	17,876	19,845	4	4,961
Drogheda Urban	27,656	28,537	6	4,756
Dundalk South	30,207	38,195	7	5,457
Dundalk Carlingford	25,599	26,092	6	4,349
Ardee	29,026	27,034	6	4,506

The table below sets out the electorate population of the county broken down by Local Electoral Area.

LEA	Electorate (2022)	Seats	Electorate per seat
Drogheda Rural	14,133	4	3,533
Drogheda Urban	19,729	6	3,288
Dundalk South	25,691	7	3,670
Dundalk Carlingford	20,039	6	3,339
Ardee	19,928	6	3,321

== Population by municipal district ==
The table below sets out the population of the county broken down by Municipal District, total 2022 population of 139,703.

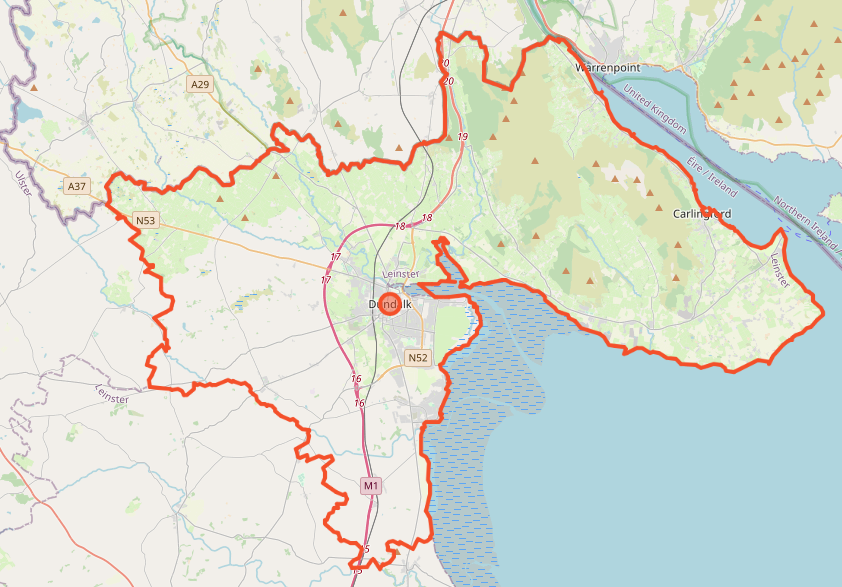
Dundalk Municipal District

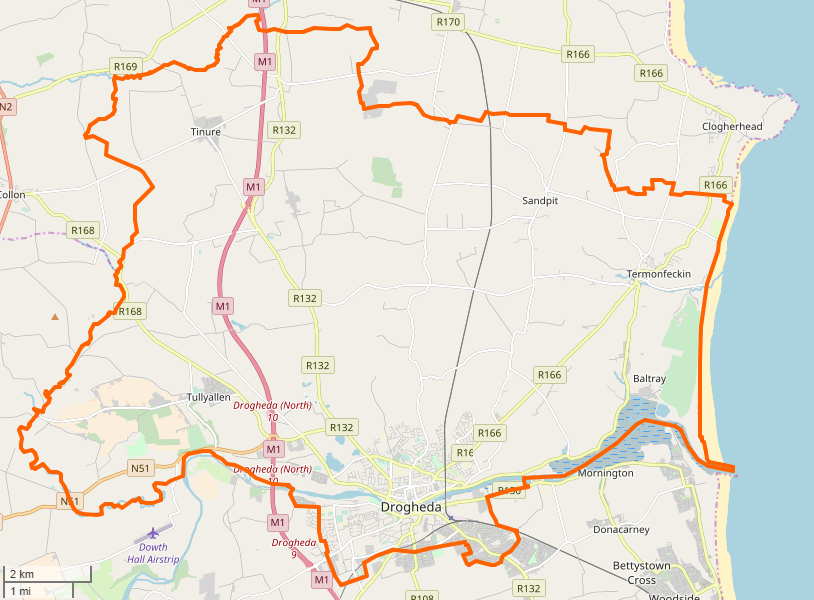
Drogheda Municipal District

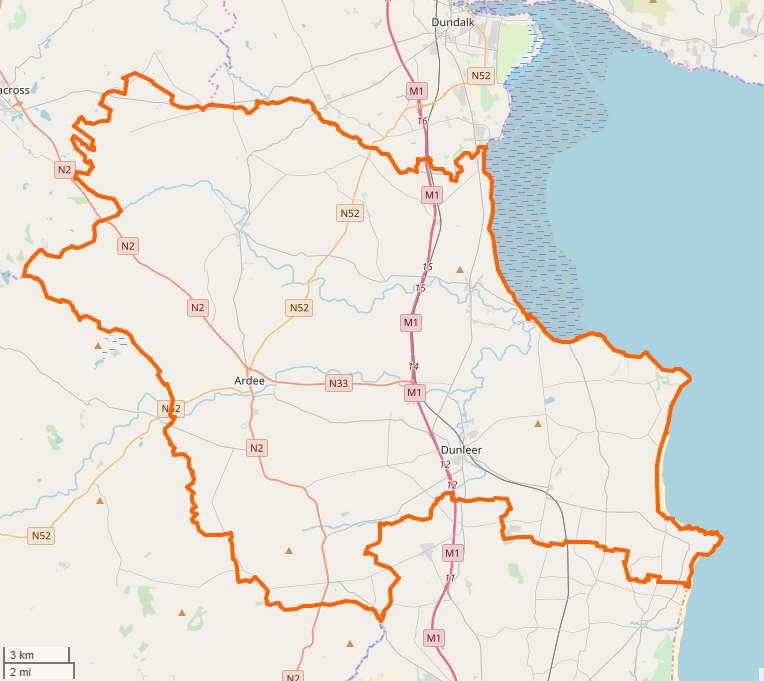
Ardee Municipal District

District	Population (2011)	Population (2016)	Population (2022)	Seats	Population per seat
Dundalk	53,082	55,806	64,287	13	4,945
Drogheda	41,925	44,052	48,382	10	4,838
Ardee	27,890	29,026	27,034	6	4,506

== Population by electoral division ==
The table below sets out the population of the county broken down by electoral division.

Electoral Division	Population (2006)	Population (2011)	Population (2016)
Louth	111,267	122,897	128,375
Dundalk (Town + Rural)	51,758	56,761	59,557
Dundalk Town	29,037	31,149	32,288
004 Dundalk Urban No. 1	2,190	2,148	2,169
005 Dundalk Urban No. 2	1,211	1,169	1,140
006 Dundalk Urban No. 3	1,400	1,449	1,710
007 Dundalk Urban No. 4	6,183	6,039	5,970
023 Castletown (Part Urban)	2,518	2,637	2,685
027 Dundalk Rural (Part Urban)	15,440	17,620	18,514
030 Haggardstown (Part Urban)	95	87	100
Dundalk rural area	22,721	25,612	27,269
019 Ballymascanlan	2,016	2,213	2,206
020 Barronstown	647	744	746
021 Carlingford	1,384	1,801	2,201
022 Castlering	935	1,012	1,034
023 Castletown (Part Rural)	1,421	1,573	1,622
024 Creggan Upper	684	787	852
025 Darver	562	568	678
026 Drummullagh	1,120	1,257	1,350
027 Dundalk Rural (Part Rural)	535	540	686
028 Faughart	905	991	958
029 Greenore	979	1,169	1,201
030 Haggardstown (Part Rural)	5,769	6,303	6,819
031 Jenkinstown	948	1,173	1,277
032 Killanny	683	799	825
033 Louth	1,308	1,505	1,575
034 Mansfieldstown	640	807	855
035 Rathcor	1,203	1,352	1,374
036 Ravensdale	982	1,018	1,010
Drogheda Borough	28,973	28,576	29,471
001 Fair Gate	9,783	9,806	10,317
002 St. Laurence Gate	3,801	4,004	4,075
003 West Gate	5,899	6,042	6,284
041 St. Peter's (Part Urban)	3,460	2,161	2,099
047 St. Mary's (Part Urban)	6,030	6,563	6,696
Ardee No. 1 rural area	17,976	20,262	20,924
008 Ardee Rural	2,626	2,875	2,952
009 Ardee Urban	4,301	4,554	4,917
010 Castlebellingham	1,371	1,617	1,688
011 Clonkeen	545	648	675
012 Collon	1,380	1,770	1,859
013 Dromin	535	610	629
014 Dromiskin	1,935	2,187	2,226
015 Drumcar	1,385	1,526	1,451
016 Dunleer	2,340	2,796	2,868
017 Stabannan	590	620	619
018 Tallanstown	968	1,059	1,040
Louth rural area	12,560	17,298	18,423
037 Clogher	2,494	3,031	3,237
038 Dysart	777	918	925
039 Monasterboice	1,164	1,342	1,365
040 Mullary	1,528	1,723	1,754
041 St. Peter's (Part Rural)	4,022	6,990	7,605
042 Termonfeckin	2,575	3,294	3,537
