= Jim D'Arcy =

Irish politician (born 1954)

Senator
- In office 25 May 2011 – 8 June 2016
- Constituency: Nominated by the Taoiseach

Personal details
- Born: 20 July 1954 (age 72) Drogheda, County Louth, Ireland
- Party: Fine Gael
- Children: 3
- Education: St Patrick's College, Dublin

Jim D'Arcy (born 20 July 1954) is an Irish Fine Gael politician and former member of Seanad Éireann.

He was elected to Louth County Council in 1999 for the Dundalk South electoral area, and to Dundalk Town Council in 2004 for the Dundalk South area, serving on both bodies until 2011. In May 2011, he was nominated by the Taoiseach Enda Kenny to the 24th Seanad. He had been an unsuccessful candidate in the Louth constituency at the 2007 general election. In accordance with the Dual Mandate he then relinquished his seats in local government. D'Arcy holds a distinction in that he served as Cathaoirleach of both Louth County Council and Dundalk Town Council, and is only one of three officeholders to have held this honour.

He is a former school principal of Bellurgan National School. He was the Fine Gael Seanad spokesperson on Education and Skills during his term until 2016.

In 2017 D'Arcy was appointed a special advisor to Taoiseach Leo Varadkar on Northern Ireland, Border Issues and Brexit. He was subsequently described as the Taoiseach's Northern Advisor and held a direct liaison link with the Shared Ireland Unit previously established by the Tánaiste, Micheál Martin, and represented the Irish government on the Council of Europe.

During the 2024 local elections in Louth he was the Fine Gael director of elections and was re-appointed for the next general election campaign in the Louth constituency.
