= Colm Markey =

Irish politician (born 1972)

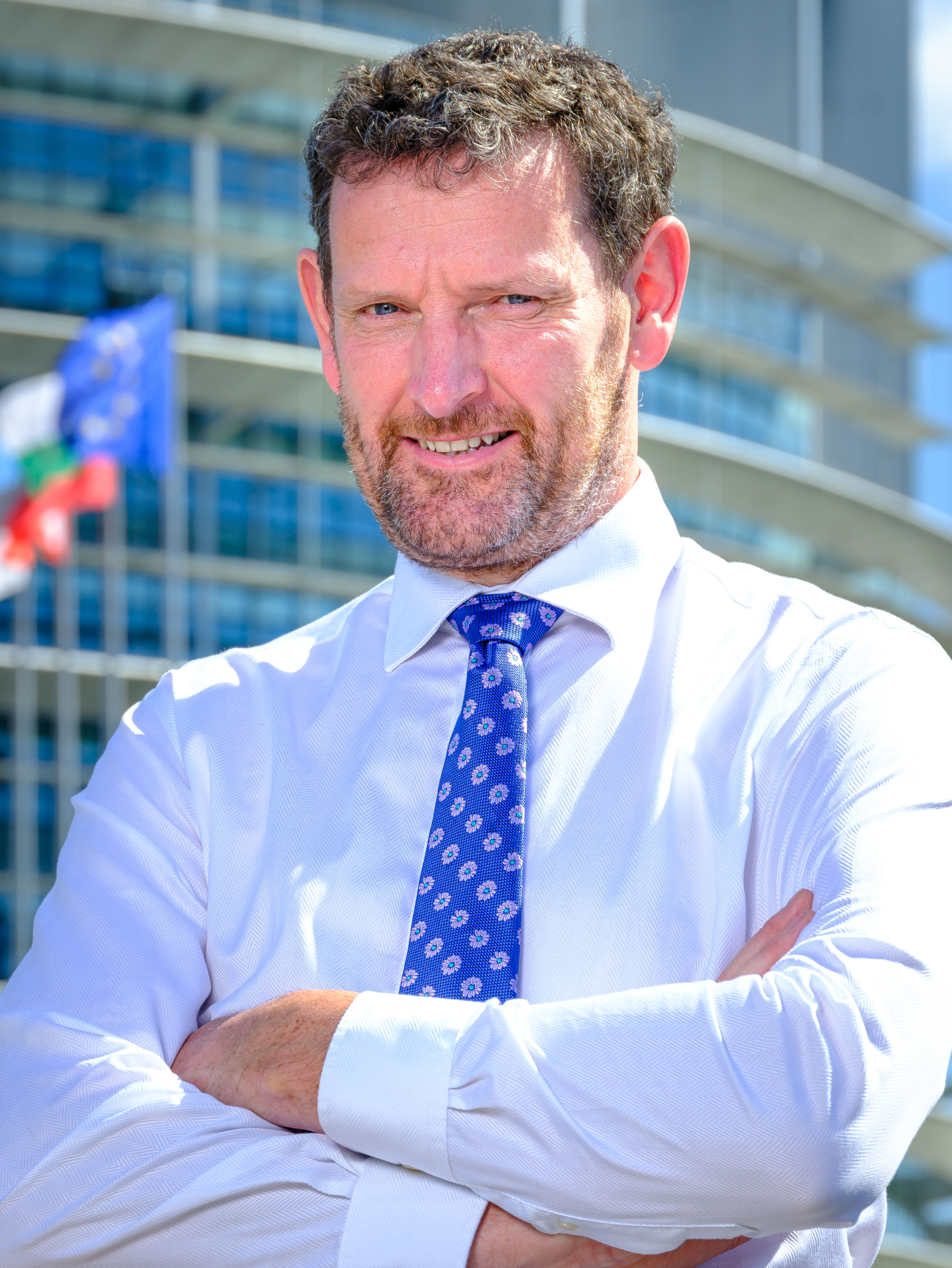
- Markey in 2021

Member of the European Parliament
- In office 20 November 2020 – 17 July 2024
- Constituency: Midlands–North-West

Personal details
- Born: 3 January 1972 (age 54) Drogheda, County Louth, Ireland
- Party: Ireland: Fine Gael; EU: European People's Party

Colm Markey (born 3 January 1972) is an Irish politician who served as a Member of the European Parliament (MEP) from Ireland for the Midlands–North-West constituency from November 2020 to July 2024. He is a member of Fine Gael, part of the European People's Party.

== Political career ==
He is a member of the European Parliament Committee on Agriculture and Rural Development (AGRI) and a substitute on the Committee on Transport and Tourism (TRAN), the Committee on Fisheries (PECH), the Committee of Inquiry on the Protection of Animals during Transport (ANIT) and the Delegation for relations with Mercosur (DMER).

Markey was a member of Louth County Council from 2009 to 2020. He is a former president of Macra na Feirme. In November 2020, he replaced Mairead McGuinness as an MEP in the European Parliament following her appointment as European Commissioner.

In March 2024, Markey announced that he would not seek re-election to the European Parliament at the 2024 European Parliament election.
