= Terry Brennan (politician) =

Irish politician (1942–2020)

Senator
- In office 25 May 2011 – 8 June 2016
- Constituency: Labour Panel

Personal details
- Born: 24 May 1942 Carlingford, County Louth, Ireland
- Died: 19 June 2020 (aged 78)
- Party: Fine Gael

Terry Brennan (24 May 1942 – 19 June 2020) was an Irish Fine Gael politician. He was elected to Seanad Éireann on the Labour Panel in April 2011. He was a member of Louth County Council from 1985 to 2011. He initially represented the three seat Carlingford LEA from 1985-1999 and from 1999 represented the Dundalk-Carlingford electoral area comprising rural North Louth and the Northern parts of Urban Dundalk.

He was an unsuccessful candidate for the Louth constituency at the 1997 and 2002 general elections. He was the Fine Gael Seanad spokesperson on Tourism and Sport between 2011 and 2016. He lost his seat at the 2016 Seanad election.

Before entering politics Brennan was a member of the ESB.
