= Declan Breathnach =

Irish former politician (born 1958)

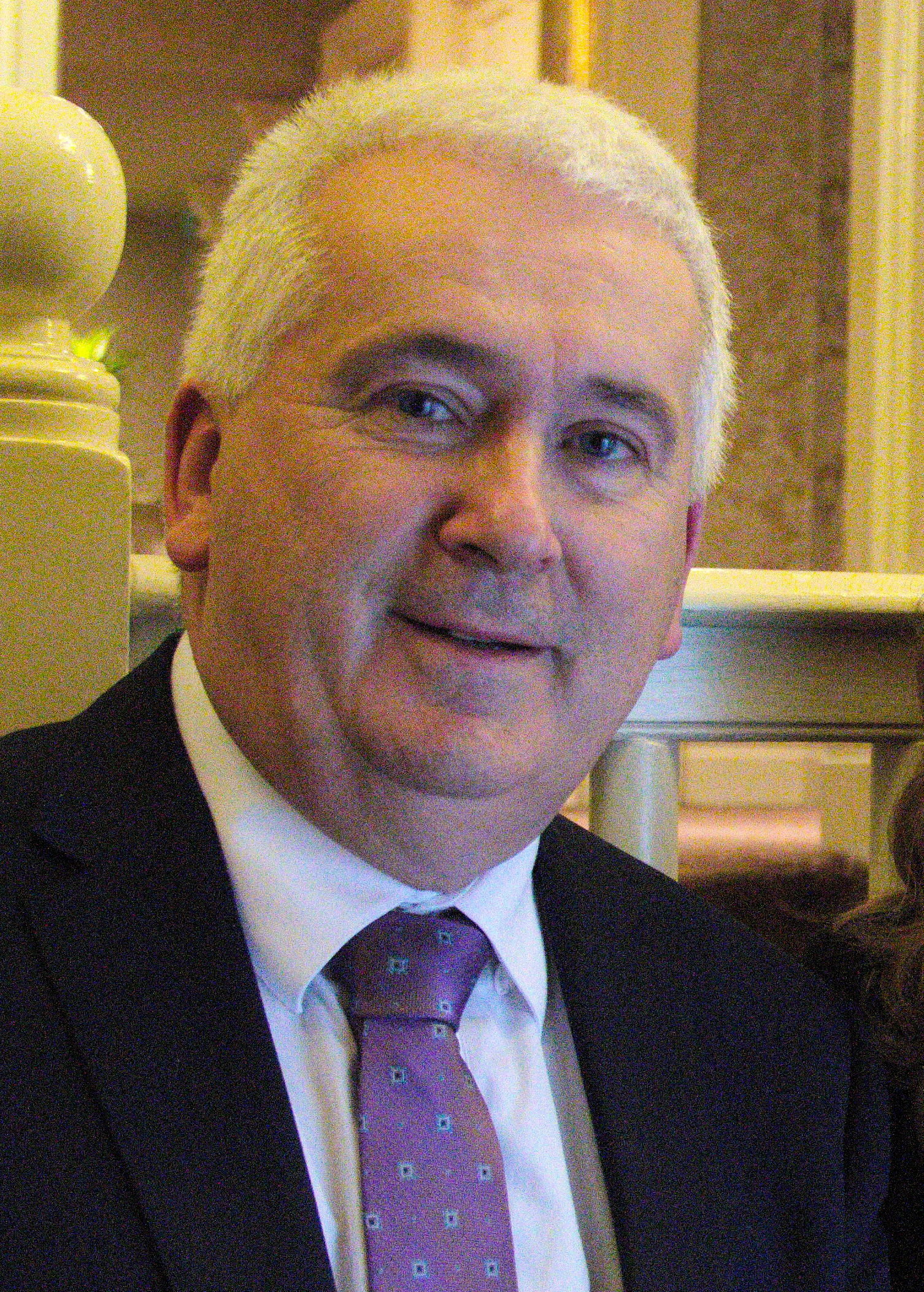
- Breathnach in 2016

Teachta Dála
- In office February 2016 – February 2020
- Constituency: Louth

Personal details
- Born: 3 June 1958 (age 68) Knockbridge, County Louth, Ireland
- Party: Fianna Fáil
- Spouse: Dorothy Breathnach (m. 1981; div. 2007)
- Children: 2
- Education: St Patrick's College, Dublin

Declan Breathnach (born 3 June 1958) is an Irish former Fianna Fáil politician who served as a Teachta Dála (TD) for the Louth constituency from 2016 to 2020.

== Early life ==
A native of Knockbridge, Dundalk, Breathnach was educated at Dundalk CBS (now Coláiste Rís) and St Patrick's College (which has become a part of Dublin City University), where he earned a Bachelor degree in Education. He has worked within primary schools for 35 years as a teacher and principal.

== Political career ==
Breathnach has been a member of Fianna Fáil since his early teens. He had served as a Cumann Secretary, member of the officer board of Louth Comhairle Dáil Ceantair (constituency council) and as the Louth constituency representative on the Fianna Fáil National Executive, a position held up until his election as a member of Louth County Council in 1991. Since Breathnach's first election to Louth County Council in 1991, he successfully retained his seat for 25 years, across 5 elections.

Breathnach served as a Louth County Councillor until 2016 and was elected on two occasions as Cathaoirleach of the council. He also served as joint chairperson of the memorandum of association between Down Council and Louth Council from 2010 to 2015. In 2010 as Leas-Chathaoirleach (deputy chair) of Louth County Council he signed this memorandum in Brussels with representatives of Newry and Mourne District Council, Dundalk Town Council, Drogheda Borough Council and Ardee Town Council. This led to the creation of the committee of which he became the joint chairperson. He also was a member of the East Border Regions committee, and served as the chairperson of the Louth County Council Special Policy Group on Infrastructure, European and Cross-Border Matters.

He successfully contested the Louth constituency at 2016 general election, receiving 9,099 first preference votes (13.5%). He previously contested the Louth constituency at 2011 general election but was not elected.

Recognising his particular interest in Cross-Border matters Breathnach was appointed as Fianna Fáil Spokesperson on North-South Bodies & Cross-Border Co-Operation and Vice-Chairman of the Oireachtas Joint Committee on the Implementation of the Good Friday Agreement. He also served as Vice-Chairperson of the British–Irish Parliamentary Assembly.

Breathnach lost his Dáil seat at the 2020 general election, leaving the Louth constituency without a Fianna Fáil TD for the first time in the history of the state. He also contested the 2020 Seanad election, but was unsuccessful.

== Addendum ==
On 9 July 2020, Breathnach formally apologised to Sinn Féin President Mary Lou McDonald regarding a tweet from 11 October 2018. The tweet, posted on the second anniversary of the murder of Garda Tony Golden, has been deleted since. The tweet accused McDonald of being a hypocrite and condoning the deaths of multiple Gardaí, the settlement included a formal apology to McDonald but other terms were kept confidential.

Dáil	Election	Deputy (Party)	Deputy (Party)	Deputy (Party)	Deputy (Party)	Deputy (Party)
4th	1923	Frank Aiken (Rep)	Peter Hughes (CnaG)	James Murphy (CnaG)	3 seats until 1977	
5th	1927 (Jun)	Frank Aiken (FF)	James Coburn (NL)	James Murphy (CnaG)	3 seats until 1977	
6th	1927 (Sep)	Frank Aiken (FF)	James Coburn (NL)	James Murphy (CnaG)	3 seats until 1977	
7th	1932	Frank Aiken (FF)	James Coburn (Ind.)	James Murphy (CnaG)	3 seats until 1977	
8th	1933	Frank Aiken (FF)	James Coburn (Ind.)	James Murphy (CnaG)	3 seats until 1977	
9th	1937	Frank Aiken (FF)	James Coburn (FG)	Laurence Walsh (FF)	3 seats until 1977	
10th	1938	Frank Aiken (FF)	James Coburn (FG)	Laurence Walsh (FF)	3 seats until 1977	
11th	1943	Frank Aiken (FF)	James Coburn (FG)	Roddy Connolly (Lab)	3 seats until 1977	
12th	1944	Frank Aiken (FF)	James Coburn (FG)	Laurence Walsh (FF)	3 seats until 1977	
13th	1948	Frank Aiken (FF)	James Coburn (FG)	Roddy Connolly (Lab)	3 seats until 1977	
14th	1951	Frank Aiken (FF)	James Coburn (FG)	Laurence Walsh (FF)	3 seats until 1977	
14th	1954 by-election	Frank Aiken (FF)	George Coburn (FG)	Laurence Walsh (FF)	3 seats until 1977	
15th	1954	Frank Aiken (FF)	George Coburn (FG)	Paddy Donegan (FG)	3 seats until 1977	
16th	1957	Frank Aiken (FF)	George Coburn (FG)	Pádraig Faulkner (Note: Faulker served as Ceann Comhairle in the 21st Dáil from 1977 to 1981, and was returned automatically at the 1981 election.) (FF)	3 seats until 1977	
17th	1961	Frank Aiken (FF)	Paddy Donegan (FG)	Pádraig Faulkner (FF)	3 seats until 1977	
18th	1965	Frank Aiken (FF)	Paddy Donegan (FG)	Pádraig Faulkner (FF)	3 seats until 1977	
19th	1969	Frank Aiken (FF)	Paddy Donegan (FG)	Pádraig Faulkner (FF)	3 seats until 1977	
20th	1973	Joseph Farrell (FF)	Paddy Donegan (FG)	Pádraig Faulkner (FF)	3 seats until 1977	
21st	1977	Joseph Farrell (FF)	Paddy Donegan (FG)	Pádraig Faulkner (FF)	Eddie Filgate (FF)	4 seats 1977–2011
22nd	1981	Paddy Agnew (AHB)	Bernard Markey (FG)	Pádraig Faulkner (FF)	Eddie Filgate (FF)	4 seats 1977–2011
23rd	1982 (Feb)	Thomas Bellew (FF)	Bernard Markey (FG)	Pádraig Faulkner (FF)	Eddie Filgate (FF)	4 seats 1977–2011
24th	1982 (Nov)	Michael Bell (Lab)	Brendan McGahon (FG)	Pádraig Faulkner (FF)	Séamus Kirk (Note: Kirk served as Ceann Comhairle in the 30th Dáil from 2009 to 2011, and was returned automatically at the 2011 election.) (FF)	4 seats 1977–2011
25th	1987	Michael Bell (Lab)	Brendan McGahon (FG)	Dermot Ahern (FF)	Séamus Kirk (FF)	4 seats 1977–2011
26th	1989	Michael Bell (Lab)	Brendan McGahon (FG)	Dermot Ahern (FF)	Séamus Kirk (FF)	4 seats 1977–2011
27th	1992	Michael Bell (Lab)	Brendan McGahon (FG)	Dermot Ahern (FF)	Séamus Kirk (FF)	4 seats 1977–2011
28th	1997	Michael Bell (Lab)	Brendan McGahon (FG)	Dermot Ahern (FF)	Séamus Kirk (FF)	4 seats 1977–2011
29th	2002	Arthur Morgan (SF)	Fergus O'Dowd (FG)	Dermot Ahern (FF)	Séamus Kirk (FF)	4 seats 1977–2011
30th	2007	Arthur Morgan (SF)	Fergus O'Dowd (FG)	Dermot Ahern (FF)	Séamus Kirk (FF)	4 seats 1977–2011
31st	2011	Gerry Adams (SF)	Fergus O'Dowd (FG)	Ged Nash (Lab)	Séamus Kirk (FF)	Peter Fitzpatrick (FG)
32nd	2016	Gerry Adams (SF)	Fergus O'Dowd (FG)	Declan Breathnach (FF)	Imelda Munster (SF)	Peter Fitzpatrick (FG)
33rd	2020	Ruairí Ó Murchú (SF)	Fergus O'Dowd (FG)	Ged Nash (Lab)	Imelda Munster (SF)	Peter Fitzpatrick (Ind.)
34th	2024	Ruairí Ó Murchú (SF)	Paula Butterly (FG)	Ged Nash (Lab)	Joanna Byrne (SF)	Erin McGreehan (FF)
