= Sean Conway (Irish politician) =

Irish pharmacist and politician (1931–1995)

Senator
- In office 13 May 1982 – 23 February 1983
- Constituency: Administrative Panel

Personal details
- Born: 1931; County Meath, Ireland
- Died: 27 December 1995 (aged 63–64); County Meath, Ireland
- Political party: Fianna Fáil
- Spouses: Carmel Conway; Rosemary Blood
- Children: 6
- Education: Rockwell College

Sean Conway (1931 – 27 December 1995) was a Fianna Fáil politician from County Meath in Ireland. He was a senator from 1982 to 1983. He was a member of Meath County Council from 1963 to 1991.

Conway was a pharmacist, who stood unsuccessfully as a Fianna Fáil candidate for Dáil Éireann in the Meath constituency at three successive general elections: 1981, February 1982 and November 1982. After his February 1982 defeat, he was elected to the 16th Seanad on the Administrative Panel, but was defeated in the 1983 election to the 17th Seanad.
