= 1982 Irish general election =

Two general elections were held in the Republic of Ireland in 1982:

- February 1982 Irish general election
- November 1982 Irish general election
