= Meath (Dáil constituency) =

Dáil constituency (1923–1937, 1948–2007)

- Former Dáil constituency

Former constituency
- Created: 1923
- Abolished: 1937
- Seats: 3
- Local government areas: County Meath; County Kildare
- Created from: Louth–Meath
- Replaced by: Meath–Westmeath

Meath
- Former Dáil constituency

Former constituency
- Created: 1948
- Abolished: 2007
- Seats: 3 (1948–1977); 4 (1977–1981); 5 (1981–2007)
- Local government areas: County Meath; County Kildare
- Created from: Meath–Westmeath
- Replaced by: Meath East; Meath West

Meath was a parliamentary constituency represented in Dáil Éireann, the lower house of the Irish parliament or Oireachtas from 1923 to 1937 and from 1948 to 2007. The method of election was proportional representation by means of the single transferable vote (PR-STV).

== History and boundaries ==
The constituency was first created under the Electoral Act 1923 for the 1923 general election, electing 3 deputies (Teachtaí Dála, commonly known as TDs). It was abolished in 1937. It was recreated under the Electoral (Amendment) Act 1947 for the 1948 general election, again electing 3 deputies. It gained a fourth seat in 1977 and a fifth seat in 1981.

It was abolished for the 2007 general election, being divided into the two new 3-seat constituencies of Meath East and Meath West.

The constituency spanned the entire area of County Meath in Leinster, taking in Navan, Trim and Ashbourne. It also included small parts of County Kildare.

== TDs ==
=== TDs 1923–1937 ===
Teachtaí Dála (TDs) for Meath 1923–1937
Key to parties: CnaG = Cumann na nGaedheal; FP = Farmers' Party; FF = Fianna Fáil; Lab = Labour
Dáil	Election	Deputy (Party)	Deputy (Party)	Deputy (Party)
4th	1923	Patrick Mulvany (FP)	David Hall (Lab)	Eamonn Duggan (CnaG)
5th	1927 (Jun)	Matthew O'Reilly (FF)	David Hall (Lab)	Eamonn Duggan (CnaG)
6th	1927 (Sep)	Matthew O'Reilly (FF)	Arthur Matthews (CnaG)	Eamonn Duggan (CnaG)
7th	1932	James Kelly (FF)	Arthur Matthews (CnaG)	Eamonn Duggan (CnaG)
8th	1933	James Kelly (FF)	Robert Davitt (CnaG)	Matthew O'Reilly (FF)
9th	1937	Constituency abolished. See Meath–Westmeath		

Note: The columns in this table are used only for presentational purposes, and no significance should be attached to the order of columns. For details of the order in which seats were won at each election, see the detailed results of that election.

=== TDs 1948–2007 ===
Teachtaí Dála (TDs) for Meath 1948–2007
Key to parties: FF = Fianna Fáil; FG = Fine Gael; Lab = Labour
Dáil	Election	Deputy (Party)	Deputy (Party)	Deputy (Party)	Deputy (Party)	Deputy (Party)
13th	1948	Matthew O'Reilly (FF)	Michael Hilliard (FF)	3 seats until 1977	Patrick Giles (FG)	3 seats until 1977
14th	1951	Matthew O'Reilly (FF)	Michael Hilliard (FF)	3 seats until 1977	Patrick Giles (FG)	3 seats until 1977
15th	1954	James Tully (Lab)	Michael Hilliard (FF)	3 seats until 1977	Patrick Giles (FG)	3 seats until 1977
16th	1957	James Griffin (FF)	Michael Hilliard (FF)	3 seats until 1977	Patrick Giles (FG)	3 seats until 1977
16th	1959 by-election	Henry Johnston (FF)	Michael Hilliard (FF)	3 seats until 1977	Patrick Giles (FG)	3 seats until 1977
17th	1961	James Tully (Lab)	Michael Hilliard (FF)	3 seats until 1977	Denis Farrelly (FG)	3 seats until 1977
18th	1965	James Tully (Lab)	Michael Hilliard (FF)	3 seats until 1977	Denis Farrelly (FG)	3 seats until 1977
19th	1969	James Tully (Lab)	Michael Hilliard (FF)	3 seats until 1977	John Bruton (FG)	3 seats until 1977
20th	1973	James Tully (Lab)	Brendan Crinion (FF)	3 seats until 1977	John Bruton (FG)	3 seats until 1977
21st	1977	James Tully (Lab)	Brendan Crinion (FF)	Jim Fitzsimons (FF)	John Bruton (FG)	4 seats 1977–1981
22nd	1981	James Tully (Lab)	Brendan Crinion (FF)	Jim Fitzsimons (FF)	John Bruton (FG)	John V. Farrelly (FG)
23rd	1982 (Feb)	Michael Lynch (FF)	Colm Hilliard (FF)	Jim Fitzsimons (FF)	John Bruton (FG)	John V. Farrelly (FG)
24th	1982 (Nov)	Frank McLoughlin (Lab)	Colm Hilliard (FF)	Jim Fitzsimons (FF)	John Bruton (FG)	John V. Farrelly (FG)
25th	1987	Michael Lynch (FF)	Colm Hilliard (FF)	Noel Dempsey (FF)	John Bruton (FG)	John V. Farrelly (FG)
26th	1989	Mary Wallace (FF)	Colm Hilliard (FF)	Noel Dempsey (FF)	John Bruton (FG)	John V. Farrelly (FG)
27th	1992	Mary Wallace (FF)	Colm Hilliard (FF)	Noel Dempsey (FF)	John Bruton (FG)	Brian Fitzgerald (Lab)
28th	1997	Mary Wallace (FF)	Johnny Brady (FF)	Noel Dempsey (FF)	John Bruton (FG)	John V. Farrelly (FG)
29th	2002	Mary Wallace (FF)	Johnny Brady (FF)	Noel Dempsey (FF)	John Bruton (FG)	Damien English (FG)
29th	2005 by-election	Mary Wallace (FF)	Johnny Brady (FF)	Noel Dempsey (FF)	Shane McEntee (FG)	Damien English (FG)
30th	2007	Constituency abolished. See Meath East and Meath West				

Note: The columns in this table are used only for presentational purposes, and no significance should be attached to the order of columns. For details of the order in which seats were won at each election, see the detailed results of that election.

== Elections ==
*: Outgoing TD

=== 2005 by-election ===
Following the resignation of Fine Gael TD John Bruton, a by-election was held on 11 March 2005. The seat was won by Fine Gael candidate Shane McEntee.

2005 by-election: Meath
Party	Candidate	FPv%	Count			
Party	Candidate	FPv%	1	2	3	4
Fine Gael	Shane McEntee	34.1	16,964	17,083	18,214	24,047
Fianna Fáil	Shane Cassells	32.4	16,117	16,230	17,480	21,178
Sinn Féin	Joe Reilly	12.3	6,087	6,183	6,514	
Labour	Dominic Hannigan	11.2	5,567	5,672	7,061	
Progressive Democrats	Sirena Campbell	5.4	2,679	2,746		
Green	Fergal O'Byrne	3.2	1,590	1,744		
Independent	Liam Ó Gogáin	1.4	702			
Electorate: 121,041 Valid: 49,706 Spoilt: 477 (0.9%) Quota: 24,854 Turnout: 50,183 (41.5%)

=== 2002 general election ===
2002 general election: Meath
Party	Candidate	FPv%	Count								
Party	Candidate	FPv%	1	2	3	4	5	6	7	8	9
Fianna Fáil	Noel Dempsey	18.0	11,534								
Fianna Fáil	Mary Wallace	13.7	8,759	9,072	9,104	9,284	9,645	10,007	10,261	10,374	11,635
Fianna Fáil	Johnny Brady	13.3	8,493	8,751	8,787	8,833	8,879	8,987	9,110	9,577	9,876
Fine Gael	John Bruton	11.9	7,617	7,693	7,725	7,880	8,121	8,454	9,148	10,881	
Sinn Féin	Joe Reilly	9.4	6,042	6,093	6,144	6,267	6,385	6,710	7,122	7,348	8,080
Fine Gael	Damien English	9.3	5,958	6,019	6,071	6,139	6,265	6,639	7,376	8,725	10,154
Fine Gael	John V. Farrelly	6.1	3,877	3,892	3,903	3,937	3,978	4,052	4,273		
Independent	Brian Fitzgerald	5.8	3,722	3,751	3,807	3,920	4,105	4,464	5,139	5,258	
Labour	Peter Ward	4.3	2,727	2,748	2,769	2,844	2,964	3,595			
Green	Fergal O'Byrne	3.7	2,337	2,353	2,406	2,630	2,830				
Independent	Tom Kelly	2.1	1,373	1,380	1,403	1,566					
Independent	Pat O'Brien	1.9	1,199	1,202	1,244						
Independent	Jane Colwell	0.4	263	265							
Christian Solidarity	Michael Redmond	0.3	180	181							
Electorate: 108,717 Valid: 64,081 Spoilt: N/A Quota: 10,681 Turnout: 64,081 (58.9%)

=== 1997 general election ===
1997 general election: Meath
Party	Candidate	FPv%	Count									
Party	Candidate	FPv%	1	2	3	4	5	6	7	8	9	10
Fine Gael	John Bruton	23.0	13,037									
Fianna Fáil	Noel Dempsey	15.4	8,701	8,970	9,009	9,105	9,253	9,377	9,518			
Fianna Fáil	Mary Wallace	13.5	7,669	7,850	8,017	8,052	8,201	8,387	8,774	9,452		
Fianna Fáil	Johnny Brady	13.0	7,372	7,423	7,478	7,506	7,654	7,711	7,751	8,152	8,946	9,179
Fine Gael	John V. Farrelly	9.4	5,348	7,167	7,290	7,385	7,519	7,654	7,930	8,122	8,339	10,892
Labour	Brian Fitzgerald	6.5	3,695	4,148	4,208	4,408	4,461	4,694	4,923	4,983	5,267	5,870
Fine Gael	James Holloway	4.5	2,548	3,102	3,206	3,359	3,461	3,575	3,663	3,801	4,092	
Sinn Féin	Joe Reilly	3.5	2,000	2,020	2,041	2,166	2,228	2,344	2,424	2,485		
Progressive Democrats	Ronnie Owens	2.4	1,344	1,379	1,417	1,441	1,493	1,610	1,700			
Independent	Tom Kelly	2.3	1,305	1,346	1,375	1,391	1,443	1,548				
Green	Anne Kelly McCormack	1.9	1,103	1,145	1,221	1,272	1,352					
Christian Solidarity	Brian Curran	1.8	1,031	1,055	1,070	1,089						
Democratic Left	Christy Gorman	1.4	798	848	871							
Independent	Pauline Farrelly	1.0	564	607								
Independent	Jackie O'Connell	0.3	152	157								
Independent	Jim Tallon	0.1	24	25								
Electorate: 90,125 Valid: 56,691 Spoilt: 574 (1.0%) Quota: 9,449 Turnout: 57,265 (63.5%)

=== 1992 general election ===
1992 general election: Meath
Party	Candidate	FPv%	Count										
Party	Candidate	FPv%	1	2	3	4	5	6	7	8	9	10	11
Fianna Fáil	Noel Dempsey	18.0	9,196										
Labour	Brian Fitzgerald	17.6	8,967										
Fine Gael	John Bruton	16.5	8,402	8,455	8,584								
Fianna Fáil	Mary Wallace	12.0	6,132	6,284	6,328	6,336	6,412	6,494	6,636	6,727	6,884	7,746	8,126
Fianna Fáil	Colm Hilliard	11.4	5,813	6,160	6,189	6,192	6,305	6,347	6,531	6,676	6,786	7,638	8,101
Fine Gael	John V. Farrelly	10.0	5,124	5,143	5,204	5,245	5,272	5,358	5,499	5,637	6,233	6,413	7,163
Fianna Fáil	Frances Monaghan	3.7	1,885	1,952	1,959	1,960	1,985	2,006	2,059	2,095	2,185		
Independent	Jack Fitzsimons	2.9	1,477	1,493	1,536	1,538	1,645	1,832	2,014	2,299	2,492	2,672	
Progressive Democrats	Caroline Mhic Daeid	2.2	1,135	1,141	1,168	1,172	1,184	1,259	1,284	1,372			
Independent	Brendan Cleary	1.7	852	856	866	866	887	937					
Democratic Left	Christy Gorman	1.6	809	816	874	881	959	1,058	1,086				
Green	Anne McCormack	1.3	650	657	692	695	773						
Sinn Féin	Joe Reilly	1.3	641	645	655	656							
Electorate: 78,083 Valid: 51,083 Spoilt: 698 (1.4%) Quota: 8,514 Turnout: 51,781 (66.3%)

=== 1989 general election ===
1989 general election: Meath
Party	Candidate	FPv%	Count										
Party	Candidate	FPv%	1	2	3	4	5	6	7	8	9	10	11
Fine Gael	John Bruton	18.5	9,371										
Fianna Fáil	Colm Hilliard	13.8	6,980	7,012	7,020	7,082	7,095	7,148	7,211	7,343	7,386	7,841	7,985
Fianna Fáil	Mary Wallace	13.3	6,726	6,757	6,766	6,777	6,800	6,828	6,870	6,969	7,409	8,195	8,374
Fianna Fáil	Michael Lynch	12.8	6,461	6,476	6,481	6,534	6,543	6,558	6,578	6,684	6,702	6,928	7,013
Fianna Fáil	Noel Dempsey	12.3	6,237	6,270	6,275	6,314	6,325	6,355	6,445	6,536	6,580	7,003	7,180
Fine Gael	John V. Farrelly	11.3	5,730	6,451	6,458	6,541	6,682	6,729	7,228	7,296	7,564	9,222	
Labour	Brian Fitzgerald	9.2	4,625	4,669	4,701	4,732	4,767	5,043	5,136	5,345	5,558		
Sinn Féin	Joe Reilly	2.0	1,002	1,005	1,022	1,032	1,039	1,148	1,161				
Independent	Ailish Sherrard	1.9	973	980	1,015	1,036	1,062	1,129	1,166	1,252			
Workers' Party	Christy Gorman	1.2	628	634	764	784	801						
Progressive Democrats	John Bird	1.2	609	638	640	691	944	977					
Progressive Democrats	Joe Fernandez	1.0	519	540	543	557							
Independent	William Battersby	0.8	412	416	417								
Workers' Party	John King	0.5	262	264									
Electorate: 77,127 Valid: 50,535 Quota: 8,423 Turnout: 65.5%

=== 1987 general election ===
1987 general election: Meath
Party	Candidate	FPv%	Count												
Party	Candidate	FPv%	1	2	3	4	5	6	7	8	9	10	11	12	13
Fianna Fáil	Michael Lynch	15.8	8,712	8,716	8,718	8,743	8,746	8,776	8,981	9,001	9,130	9,349			
Fine Gael	John Bruton	14.7	8,084	8,086	8,126	8,176	8,411	8,449	8,490	8,691	9,124	9,846			
Fianna Fáil	Colm Hilliard	12.3	6,763	6,765	6,775	6,817	6,832	6,911	7,098	7,133	7,497	7,922	7,966	8,019	8,635
Fianna Fáil	Noel Dempsey	11.9	6,538	6,542	6,556	6,594	6,601	6,636	6,749	6,785	7,017	7,513	7,558	7,595	8,256
Fianna Fáil	Mary Wallace	10.3	5,681	5,684	5,707	5,742	5,759	5,831	5,953	6,010	6,542	6,831	6,855	6,868	7,305
Fine Gael	John V. Farrelly	9.7	5,345	5,347	5,365	5,395	5,740	5,772	5,795	5,866	6,009	6,472	6,805	6,828	9,165
Labour	Frank McLoughlin	5.9	3,237	3,239	3,445	3,532	3,560	3,804	3,927	3,995	4,223				
Progressive Democrats	Patrick Andrews	5.9	3,227	3,227	3,246	3,322	3,352	3,402	3,456	4,628	4,892	5,528	5,643	5,659	
Independent	Gerard Marry	4.3	2,393	2,393	2,403	2,450	2,466	2,545	2,645	2,681					
Progressive Democrats	Bryan Maher	2.9	1,604	1,606	1,616	1,657	1,690	1,717	1,734						
Sinn Féin	Joe Reilly	1.8	1,012	1,012	1,014	1,033	1,044	1,198							
Workers' Party	Séamus McDonagh	1.4	790	794	812	921	938								
Fine Gael	Bernadette McMahon	1.4	743	743	747	767									
Independent	Camella Cummins	1.2	636	643	654										
Labour	Peter Archer	0.7	394	395											
Independent	Seán Gormley	0.1	36												
Electorate: 73,904 Valid: 55,195 Quota: 9,200 Turnout: 55,597 (75.2%)

=== November 1982 general election ===
November 1982 general election: Meath
Party	Candidate	FPv%	Count					
Party	Candidate	FPv%	1	2	3	4	5	6
Fine Gael	John Bruton	19.6	9,990					
Labour	Frank McLoughlin	14.1	7,179	7,293	8,026	8,317	8,561	
Fianna Fáil	Colm Hilliard	14.0	7,133	7,168	7,230	7,312	7,369	8,617
Fianna Fáil	Michael Lynch	13.7	6,991	7,008	7,034	7,055	7,132	7,606
Fianna Fáil	Jim Fitzsimons	12.0	6,133	6,158	6,209	6,292	6,347	8,652
Fine Gael	John V. Farrelly	8.6	4,380	4,917	4,974	5,820	8,687	
Fianna Fáil	Sean Conway	7.8	3,966	4,004	4,065	4,118	4,217	
Fine Gael	Laurence Clarke	4.1	2,107	2,673	2,753	3,500		
Fine Gael	Tom Kelly	4.0	2,013	2,121	2,180			
Labour	Brian Fitzgerald	2.2	1,105	1,155				
Electorate: 67,214 Valid: 50,997 Quota: 8,500 Turnout: 75.9%

=== February 1982 general election ===
February 1982 general election: Meath
Party	Candidate	FPv%	Count								
Party	Candidate	FPv%	1	2	3	4	5	6	7	8	9
Fine Gael	John Bruton	25.0	12,272								
Fianna Fáil	Michael Lynch	16.4	8,033	8,099	8,106	8,225					
Fianna Fáil	Jim Fitzsimons	12.2	5,994	6,095	6,101	6,383	6,440	6,452	6,505	6,542	6,932
Fianna Fáil	Colm Hilliard	11.8	5,778	5,880	5,884	6,189	6,269	6,285	6,404	6,515	7,126
Fianna Fáil	Sean Conway	10.5	5,165	5,338	5,349	5,438	5,479	5,489	5,532	5,604	6,120
Fine Gael	John V. Farrelly	8.2	4,023	6,570	6,579	6,708	6,870	6,871	10,025		
Fine Gael	Frank McDermott	5.7	2,770	3,472	3,476	3,537	3,660	3,665			
Labour	James Cudden	4.1	1,999	2,235	2,251	2,359	3,666	3,669	3,805	5,432	
Labour	Seán O'Brien	3.1	1,541	1,637	1,646	1,884					
Independent	Dermot Forde	2.8	1,385	1,450	1,485						
Independent	John Gormley	0.2	103	109							
Electorate: 65,220 Valid: 49,063 Quota: 8,178 Turnout: 75.2%

=== 1981 general election ===
1981 general election: Meath
Party	Candidate	FPv%	Count							
Party	Candidate	FPv%	1	2	3	4	5	6	7	8
Fine Gael	John Bruton	22.9	11,574							
Fianna Fáil	Brendan Crinion	13.1	6,623	6,731	7,016	7,073	9,549			
Fianna Fáil	Michael Lynch	12.2	6,164	6,200	6,458	6,660	7,180	7,383	7,709	
Fianna Fáil	Jim Fitzsimons	10.9	5,535	5,610	6,163	6,196	7,113	7,915	8,389	14,340
Labour	Frank McLoughlin	8.6	4,328	4,477	4,795	4,938	5,043	5,060		
Labour	James Tully	8.5	4,313	4,565	4,962	5,100	5,265	5,287	8,474	
Fianna Fáil	Sean Conway	8.0	4,042	4,171	4,379	4,410				
Fine Gael	John V. Farrelly	6.6	3,331	5,127	5,277	7,435	7,566	7,630	8,217	8,798
Independent	Dermot Forde	4.9	2,481	2,555						
Fine Gael	Frank McDermott	4.4	2,249	2,763	2,830					
Electorate: 65,220 Valid: 50,640 Quota: 8,441 Turnout: 77.6%

=== 1977 general election ===
1977 general election: Meath
Party	Candidate	FPv%	Count									
Party	Candidate	FPv%	1	2	3	4	5	6	7	8	9	10
Fianna Fáil	Brendan Crinion	24.8	11,398									
Fine Gael	John Bruton	17.6	8,091	8,145	8,146	8,166	8,193	8,722	9,014	10,492		
Fianna Fáil	Jim Fitzsimons	16.9	7,795	9,322								
Fianna Fáil	Michael Lynch	12.8	5,891	6,339	6,446	6,466	6,513	6,553	7,192	7,290	7,343	7,642
Labour	James Tully	11.6	5,347	5,385	5,386	5,392	5,427	5,511	5,909	6,236	6,934	9,218
Labour	Frank McLoughlin	5.3	2,444	2,500	2,501	2,519	2,530	2,549	2,682	2,921	3,207	
Fine Gael	Michael Regan	4.2	1,938	1,956	1,956	1,988	1,997	2,157	2,279			
Independent	Dermot Forde	4.2	1,911	1,934	1,935	1,963	2,006	2,055				
Fine Gael	Jim Dorgan	1.9	880	893	894	904	913					
Independent	Frank Godfrey	0.4	187	195	196	207						
Independent	Edward McKeever	0.3	158	162	162							
Electorate: 58,569 Valid: 46,040 Quota: 9,209 Turnout: 78.6%

=== 1973 general election ===
1973 general election: Meath
Party	Candidate	FPv%	Count				
Party	Candidate	FPv%	1	2	3	4	5
Fianna Fáil	Brendan Crinion	28.0	8,555				
Fine Gael	John Bruton	26.5	8,099				
Labour	James Tully	19.1	5,824	5,883	5,977	6,946	7,729
Fianna Fáil	Michael Hilliard	18.6	5,695	6,493	6,511	6,585	6,891
Independent	Desmond Ferguson	4.7	1,427	1,458	1,473	1,577	
Fine Gael	Denis Farrelly	3.2	974	997	1,325		
Electorate: 36,214 Valid: 30,574 Quota: 7,644 Turnout: 84.4%

=== 1969 general election ===
1969 general election: Meath
Party	Candidate	FPv%	Count					
Party	Candidate	FPv%	1	2	3	4	5	6
Fianna Fáil	Michael Hilliard	21.3	6,143	6,242	6,272	8,257		
Labour	James Tully	18.5	5,357	6,338	6,407	6,864	6,929	7,253
Fianna Fáil	Brendan Crinion	16.0	4,637	4,719	4,889	5,631	6,581	6,683
Fianna Fáil	Gerard Marry	11.7	3,392	3,441	3,458			
Fine Gael	John Bruton	10.5	3,042	3,149	4,079	4,152	4,153	7,281
Fine Gael	Denis Farrelly	10.4	2,992	3,017	3,723	3,786	3,802	
Fine Gael	Willie Carey	6.7	1,926	1,958				
Labour	John Fitzgerald	4.9	1,408					
Electorate: 36,621 Valid: 28,897 Quota: 7,225 Turnout: 79.6%

=== 1965 general election ===
1965 general election: Meath
Party	Candidate	FPv%	Count			
Party	Candidate	FPv%	1	2	3	4
Labour	James Tully	28.8	7,752			
Fianna Fáil	Michael Hilliard	28.0	7,544			
Fine Gael	Denis Farrelly	19.6	5,271	5,638	6,664	6,710
Fianna Fáil	Gerard Marry	10.0	2,706	2,981	3,070	3,309
Fianna Fáil	Patrick McKenna	9.6	2,577	2,814	2,854	3,381
Fine Gael	Patrick Fullam	4.0	1,077	1,218		
Electorate: 34,245 Valid: 26,927 Quota: 6,732 Turnout: 78.6%

=== 1961 general election ===
1961 general election: Meath
Party	Candidate	FPv%	Count					
Party	Candidate	FPv%	1	2	3	4	5	6
Labour	James Tully	26.7	6,721					
Fianna Fáil	Michael Hilliard	26.1	6,563					
Fine Gael	Denis Farrelly	12.0	3,008	3,062	3,073	3,323	3,569	5,917
Fine Gael	Patrick O'Brien	10.7	2,687	2,838	2,854	3,280	3,402	
Fianna Fáil	Henry Johnston	9.4	2,375	2,467	2,631	2,849	4,738	4,996
Fianna Fáil	Edward Daly	9.2	2,314	2,347	2,421	2,596		
Independent	James Finn	5.9	1,473	1,578	1,590			
Electorate: 33,536 Valid: 25,141 Quota: 6,286 Turnout: 75.0%

=== 1959 by-election ===
Following the death of Fianna Fáil TD James Griffin, a by-election was held on 22 July 1959. The seat was won by Fianna Fáil candidate Henry Johnston.

1959 by-election: Meath
Party	Candidate	FPv%	Count		
Party	Candidate	FPv%	1	2	3
Fianna Fáil	Henry Johnston	43.2	11,063	11,338	12,475
Labour	James Tully	27.0	6,918	7,593	10,926
Fine Gael	Denis Farrelly	22.5	5,751	6,100	
Sinn Féin	Leo Collins	7.4	1,889		
Electorate: 37,686 Valid: 25,621 Quota: 12,811 Turnout: 68.0%

=== 1957 general election ===
1957 general election: Meath
Party	Candidate	FPv%	Count				
Party	Candidate	FPv%	1	2	3	4	5
Fianna Fáil	Michael Hilliard	25.7	7,600				
Fianna Fáil	James Griffin	17.4	5,154	5,251	5,321	7,388	7,935
Fine Gael	Patrick Giles	16.9	5,006	5,014	6,648	6,776	7,199
Labour	James Tully	16.0	4,751	4,761	4,869	5,110	5,934
Sinn Féin	Seán MacCormac	9.0	2,658	2,664	2,692	2,790	
Fianna Fáil	Henry Johnston	8.5	2,521	2,589	2,650		
Fine Gael	Patrick Fullam	6.5	1,938	1,941			
Electorate: 39,108 Valid: 29,628 Quota: 7,408 Turnout: 75.8%

=== 1954 general election ===
1954 general election: Meath
Party	Candidate	FPv%	Count					
Party	Candidate	FPv%	1	2	3	4	5	6
Fianna Fáil	Michael Hilliard	27.1	8,246					
Labour	James Tully	23.0	7,009	7,018	7,051	7,146	7,319	8,026
Fine Gael	Patrick Giles	21.0	6,373	6,388	6,409	7,177	8,844	
Fianna Fáil	Matthew O'Reilly	18.7	5,691	5,697	6,278	6,328	6,438	6,648
Fine Gael	Denis Farrelly	5.1	1,547	1,571	1,574	2,108		
Fine Gael	Patrick Dillon	4.6	1,392	1,485	1,489			
Independent	Matthew Cullen	0.5	155					
Electorate: 39,598 Valid: 30,413 Quota: 7,604 Turnout: 76.8%

=== 1951 general election ===
1951 general election: Meath
Party	Candidate	FPv%	Count		
Party	Candidate	FPv%	1	2	3
Fianna Fáil	Michael Hilliard	29.9	9,018		
Fine Gael	Patrick Giles	22.7	6,838	6,878	9,717
Fianna Fáil	Matthew O'Reilly	22.5	6,796	8,131	
Labour	James Tully	13.6	4,113	4,148	4,569
Fine Gael	Patrick Oliver Meegan	11.3	3,412	3,475	
Electorate: 39,694 Valid: 30,177 Quota: 7,545 Turnout: 76.0%

=== 1948 general election ===
1948 general election: Meath
Party	Candidate	FPv%	Count					
Party	Candidate	FPv%	1	2	3	4	5	6
Fianna Fáil	Michael Hilliard	29.7	8,929					
Fianna Fáil	Matthew O'Reilly	21.6	6,501	7,781				
Fine Gael	Patrick Giles	19.2	5,774	5,812	6,298	6,403	6,614	7,322
Labour	John Fitzgerald	6.5	1,943	1,969	1,998	2,060	3,048	3,480
Independent	Seán Doyle	6.4	1,907	1,935	2,031	2,072	2,122	
Clann na Poblachta	James Hilliard	5.4	1,620	1,644	1,660	2,529	2,724	3,022
Labour	Bernard Henry	5.1	1,534	1,549	1,561	1,630		
Clann na Poblachta	Eamon Ginnell	3.9	1,164	1,170	1,179			
Fine Gael	George Ahern	2.2	665	667				
Electorate: 39,935 Valid: 30,037 Quota: 7,510 Turnout: 75.2%

=== 1933 general election ===
1933 general election: Meath
Party	Candidate	FPv%	Count			
Party	Candidate	FPv%	1	2	3	4
Fianna Fáil	James Kelly	29.0	9,044			
Fianna Fáil	Matthew O'Reilly	26.9	8,399			
Cumann na nGaedheal	Robert Davitt	23.3	7,289	7,474	7,550	8,095
National Centre Party	Duc George De Stacpoole	18.8	5,873	6,444	6,801	7,016
Independent	Thomas Bowers	2.0	615	1,097	1,257	
Electorate: 37,120 Valid: 31,220 Quota: 7,806 Turnout: 84.1%

=== 1932 general election ===
1932 general election: Meath
Party	Candidate	FPv%	Count	
Party	Candidate	FPv%	1	2
Fianna Fáil	James Kelly	33.7	9,283	
Cumann na nGaedheal	Eamonn Duggan	30.6	8,428	
Fianna Fáil	Matthew O'Reilly	22.2	6,110	8,436
Cumann na nGaedheal	Arthur Matthews	13.4	3,690	3,769
Electorate: 36,706 Valid: 27,511 Quota: 6,878 Turnout: 75.0%

=== September 1927 general election ===
September 1927 general election: Meath
Party	Candidate	FPv%	Count					
Party	Candidate	FPv%	1	2	3	4	5	6
Cumann na nGaedheal	Eamonn Duggan	34.3	8,971					
Fianna Fáil	Matthew O'Reilly	25.5	6,661					
Cumann na nGaedheal	Arthur Matthews	12.0	3,146	5,301	5,304	5,463	5,772	6,464
Fianna Fáil	James Kelly	11.7	3,053	3,144	3,251	3,378	3,697	5,349
Labour	Cathal O'Shannon	10.5	2,735	2,827	2,840	2,874	3,222	
National League	Richard McDonnell	4.4	1,142	1,195	1,201	1,235		
Independent	Christopher Black	1.6	415	464	465			
Electorate: 37,709 Valid: 26,123 Quota: 6,531 Turnout: 69.3%

=== June 1927 general election ===
June 1927 general election: Meath
Party	Candidate	FPv%	Count					
Party	Candidate	FPv%	1	2	3	4	5	6
Cumann na nGaedheal	Eamonn Duggan	24.9	6,371	6,481				
Fianna Fáil	Matthew O'Reilly	17.3	4,416	4,544	6,502			
Labour	David Hall	15.0	3,828	4,813	5,198	5,247	5,305	5,983
Farmers' Party	John Quinn	13.5	3,452	3,501	3,599	3,617	3,643	
National League	William Fallon	13.4	3,420	3,519	3,625	3,639	3,665	5,844
Fianna Fáil	James Kelly	10.0	2,556	2,667				
Labour	Christopher Matthews	5.9	1,521					
Electorate: 37,709 Valid: 25,564 Quota: 6,392 Turnout: 67.8%

=== 1923 general election ===
1923 general election: Meath
Party	Candidate	FPv%	Count				
Party	Candidate	FPv%	1	2	3	4	5
Cumann na nGaedheal	Eamonn Duggan	35.6	8,262				
Farmers' Party	Patrick Mulvany	17.1	3,974	4,642	4,688	4,933	6,393
Republican	John J. O'Kelly	16.9	3,926	3,948	3,988	4,218	4,271
Labour	David Hall	14.2	3,288	3,588	3,621	4,936	5,571
Labour	Christopher Matthews	8.4	1,952	2,192	2,210		
Cumann na nGaedheal	Thomas Clinton	7.0	1,633	2,832	2,862	3,004	
Independent	Patrick White	0.8	183	211			
Electorate: 37,300 Valid: 23,218 Quota: 5,805 Turnout: 62.3%

== See also ==
- Dáil constituencies
- Politics of the Republic of Ireland
- Historic Dáil constituencies
- Elections in the Republic of Ireland
