= Michael Hilliard =

Irish politician (1903–1982)

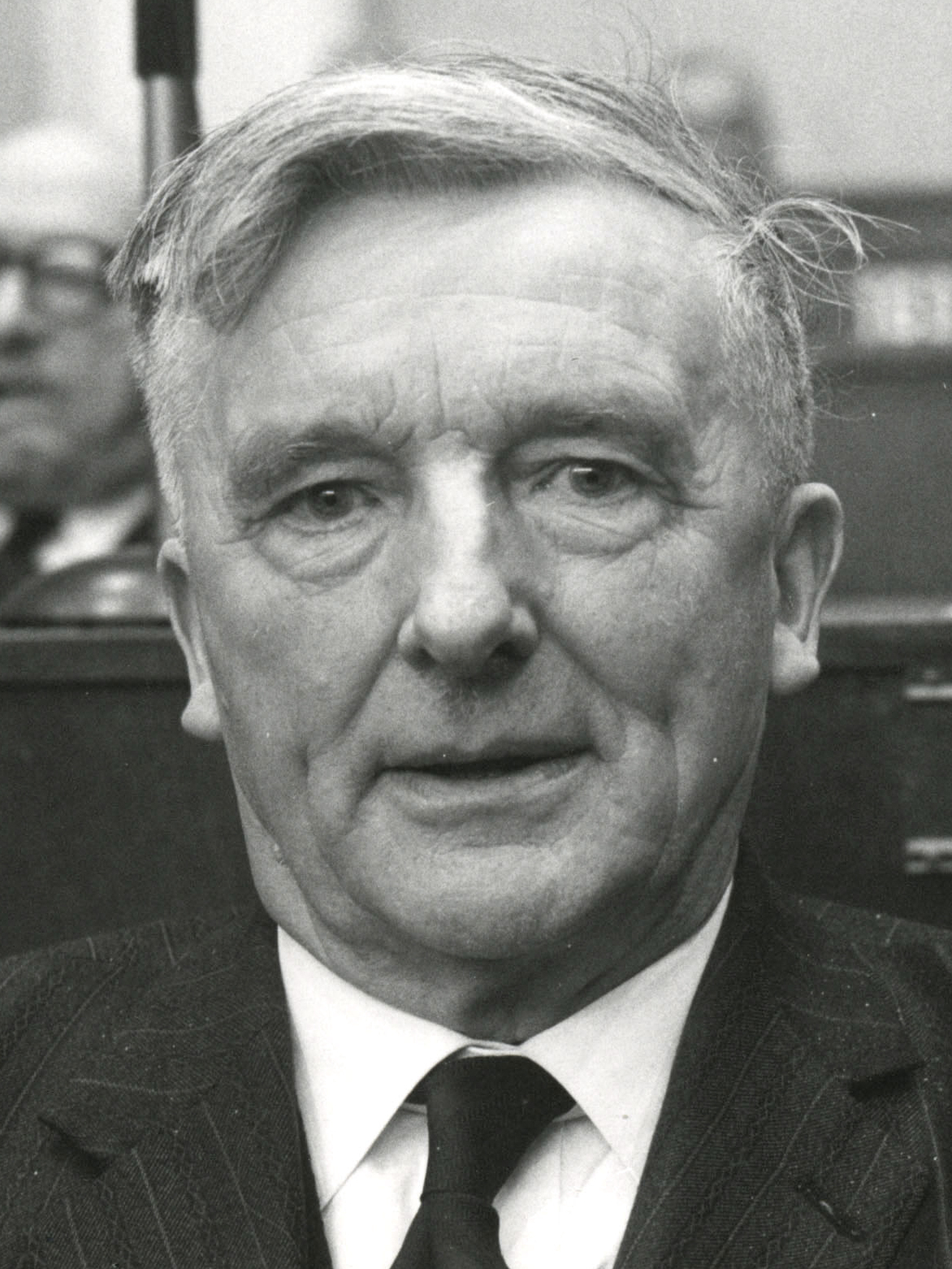
- Hilliard in 1973

Minister for Defence
- In office 21 April 1965 – 2 July 1969
- Taoiseach: Seán Lemass; Jack Lynch
- Preceded by: Gerald Bartley
- Succeeded by: Jim Gibbons

Minister for Posts and Telegraphs
- In office 23 June 1959 – 21 April 1965
- Taoiseach: Seán Lemass
- Preceded by: John Ormonde
- Succeeded by: Joseph Brennan

Parliamentary Secretary
- 1958–1959: Industry and Commerce

Member of the European Parliament
- In office January – February 1973
- Constituency: Oireachtas Delegation

Teachta Dála
- In office February 1948 – February 1973
- Constituency: Meath
- In office June 1943 – February 1948
- Constituency: Meath–Westmeath

Personal details
- Born: 11 March 1903 Navan, County Meath, Ireland
- Died: 3 August 1982 (aged 79) Navan, County Meath, Ireland
- Party: Fianna Fáil
- Spouse: Kate McMahon (m. 1925)
- Children: 10, including Colm
- Education: St Finian's College, Mullingar

Military service
- Branch/service: Irish Republican Army; Anti-Treaty IRA
- Battles/wars: Irish War of Independence; Irish Civil War

Michael Leo Hilliard (11 March 1903 – 3 August 1982) was an Irish revolutionary and later Fianna Fáil politician.

== Early life and revolutionary period ==
He was born 11 March 1903 in Navan, County Meath, fifth child of James Hilliard, a farmer and cattle dealer, and Mary Hilliard (née O'Brien). He was educated at St Finian's College, Mullingar, he left in 1920 to take part in the Irish Republican Army's (IRA) independence campaign. As Company Captain of Navan Company, 4 Battalion, 2 Meath Brigade, in 1920 he was involved in enforcing the Belfast boycott, arms raids, blocking roads and burning of Robinstown Royal Irish Constabulary Barracks.

In February 1921, Hilliard claims to have taken part in the execution of a suspected spy named “Chandeler” (sic) in Navan who was masquerading as a Michael O’Brien from Silvermines trying to join the IRA. In April 1921 was promoted to brigade intelligence officer and later Brigade Commandant. Hillard fought on the side of the Anti-Treaty IRA during the Irish Civil War.

He was arrested on 15 July 1922 but managed to escape soon after from Dundalk Jail with over 100 other IRA men. Hilliard took part in attacks on National forces until recapture in January 1923. During imprisonment, he went on hunger strike for 35 days. He recalled the experience as "a tremendous experience to have. Your mind gets crystal clear and you [are] in a sort in an ecstasy after about 21 days. You have day dreams and night dreams, you have such beautiful dreams. I can’t really explain it, but you can recall it as if you were looking at a film as to what happened to you from the very early days of your life". Hilliard was released in July 1924 and remained active in the IRA until about 1932, when he left to join Fianna Fáil. Hilliard was later awarded a pension by the Irish government under the Military Service Pensions Act, 1934 for his service with the IRA between 1920 and 1923.

== Political career ==
From 1934 he represented the party on Navan Urban District Council. He was first elected to Dáil Éireann as a Fianna Fáil Teachta Dála (TD) for the Meath–Westmeath constituency at the 1943 general election. During his career he served in the governments of Seán Lemass and Jack Lynch. During his tenure as Minister for Posts and Telegraphs Hilliard oversaw the introduction of a television service in Ireland, RTÉ. He served as Minister for Defence from 1965 to 1969.

He retained his Dáil seat at eight further general elections, switching to the Meath constituency after constituencies were revised for the 1948 general election. However, at the 1973 general election, he lost his seat to his party colleague Brendan Crinion. He did not contest any further Dáil elections.

While a TD in 1973, Hilliard was appointed a Member of the European Parliament as part of Ireland's short-lived first delegation.

His son Colm Hilliard was Fianna Fáil TD for Meath from 1982 to 1997.

Political offices
Preceded by Gerald Bartley	Parliamentary Secretary to the Minister for Industry and Commerce; 1958–1959	Office abolished
Preceded by John Ormonde	Minister for Posts and Telegraphs; 1959–1965	Succeeded by Joseph Brennan
Preceded by Gerald Bartley	Minister for Defence; 1965–1969	Succeeded by Jim Gibbons

Dáil	Election	Deputy (Party)	Deputy (Party)	Deputy (Party)	Deputy (Party)	Deputy (Party)
9th	1937	Matthew O'Reilly (FF)	Michael Kennedy (FF)	James Kelly (FF)	Charles Fagan (FG)	Patrick Giles (FG)
10th	1938	Matthew O'Reilly (FF)	Michael Kennedy (FF)	James Kelly (FF)	Charles Fagan (FG)	Patrick Giles (FG)
11th	1943	Matthew O'Reilly (FF)	Michael Kennedy (FF)	Michael Hilliard (FF)	Charles Fagan (FG)	Patrick Giles (FG)
12th	1944	Matthew O'Reilly (FF)	Michael Kennedy (FF)	Michael Hilliard (FF)	Charles Fagan (FG)	Patrick Giles (FG)
13th	1948	Constituency abolished. See Meath and Longford–Westmeath				

Dáil	Election	Deputy (Party)	Deputy (Party)	Deputy (Party)
4th	1923	Patrick Mulvany (FP)	David Hall (Lab)	Eamonn Duggan (CnaG)
5th	1927 (Jun)	Matthew O'Reilly (FF)	David Hall (Lab)	Eamonn Duggan (CnaG)
6th	1927 (Sep)	Matthew O'Reilly (FF)	Arthur Matthews (CnaG)	Eamonn Duggan (CnaG)
7th	1932	James Kelly (FF)	Arthur Matthews (CnaG)	Eamonn Duggan (CnaG)
8th	1933	James Kelly (FF)	Robert Davitt (CnaG)	Matthew O'Reilly (FF)
9th	1937	Constituency abolished. See Meath–Westmeath		

Dáil	Election	Deputy (Party)	Deputy (Party)	Deputy (Party)	Deputy (Party)	Deputy (Party)
13th	1948	Matthew O'Reilly (FF)	Michael Hilliard (FF)	3 seats until 1977	Patrick Giles (FG)	3 seats until 1977
14th	1951	Matthew O'Reilly (FF)	Michael Hilliard (FF)	3 seats until 1977	Patrick Giles (FG)	3 seats until 1977
15th	1954	James Tully (Lab)	Michael Hilliard (FF)	3 seats until 1977	Patrick Giles (FG)	3 seats until 1977
16th	1957	James Griffin (FF)	Michael Hilliard (FF)	3 seats until 1977	Patrick Giles (FG)	3 seats until 1977
16th	1959 by-election	Henry Johnston (FF)	Michael Hilliard (FF)	3 seats until 1977	Patrick Giles (FG)	3 seats until 1977
17th	1961	James Tully (Lab)	Michael Hilliard (FF)	3 seats until 1977	Denis Farrelly (FG)	3 seats until 1977
18th	1965	James Tully (Lab)	Michael Hilliard (FF)	3 seats until 1977	Denis Farrelly (FG)	3 seats until 1977
19th	1969	James Tully (Lab)	Michael Hilliard (FF)	3 seats until 1977	John Bruton (FG)	3 seats until 1977
20th	1973	James Tully (Lab)	Brendan Crinion (FF)	3 seats until 1977	John Bruton (FG)	3 seats until 1977
21st	1977	James Tully (Lab)	Brendan Crinion (FF)	Jim Fitzsimons (FF)	John Bruton (FG)	4 seats 1977–1981
22nd	1981	James Tully (Lab)	Brendan Crinion (FF)	Jim Fitzsimons (FF)	John Bruton (FG)	John V. Farrelly (FG)
23rd	1982 (Feb)	Michael Lynch (FF)	Colm Hilliard (FF)	Jim Fitzsimons (FF)	John Bruton (FG)	John V. Farrelly (FG)
24th	1982 (Nov)	Frank McLoughlin (Lab)	Colm Hilliard (FF)	Jim Fitzsimons (FF)	John Bruton (FG)	John V. Farrelly (FG)
25th	1987	Michael Lynch (FF)	Colm Hilliard (FF)	Noel Dempsey (FF)	John Bruton (FG)	John V. Farrelly (FG)
26th	1989	Mary Wallace (FF)	Colm Hilliard (FF)	Noel Dempsey (FF)	John Bruton (FG)	John V. Farrelly (FG)
27th	1992	Mary Wallace (FF)	Colm Hilliard (FF)	Noel Dempsey (FF)	John Bruton (FG)	Brian Fitzgerald (Lab)
28th	1997	Mary Wallace (FF)	Johnny Brady (FF)	Noel Dempsey (FF)	John Bruton (FG)	John V. Farrelly (FG)
29th	2002	Mary Wallace (FF)	Johnny Brady (FF)	Noel Dempsey (FF)	John Bruton (FG)	Damien English (FG)
29th	2005 by-election	Mary Wallace (FF)	Johnny Brady (FF)	Noel Dempsey (FF)	Shane McEntee (FG)	Damien English (FG)
30th	2007	Constituency abolished. See Meath East and Meath West				
