= Cahir Davitt =

Irish judge (1894–1986)

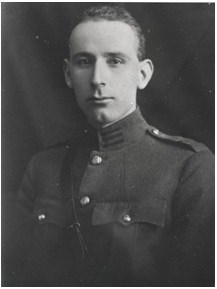

Judge of the Supreme Court
- In office 11 July 1966 – 4 January 1976
- Nominated by: Government of Ireland
- Appointed by: Éamon de Valera

President of the High Court
- In office 1 May 1951 – 10 July 1966
- Nominated by: Government of Ireland
- Appointed by: Seán T. O'Kelly
- Preceded by: George Gavan Duffy
- Succeeded by: Aindrias Ó Caoimh

Judge of the High Court
- In office 1 May 1945 – 11 July 1966
- Nominated by: Government of Ireland
- Succeeded by: Seán T. O'Kelly

Judge of the Circuit Court
- In office 1 November 1926 – 30 April 1951
- Nominated by: Government of Ireland
- Appointed by: Tim Healy

Personal details
- Born: 15 August 1894 Rathmines, Dublin, Ireland
- Died: 1 March 1986 (aged 91) Kildare, Ireland
- Spouse: Sarah Lynch (m. 1925)
- Children: 5
- Parent: Michael Davitt (father)
- Relatives: Robert Davitt (brother)
- Education: University College Dublin; King's Inns

Cahir Davitt (15 August 1894 – 1 March 1986) was an Irish judge who served as a Judge of the Supreme Court from 1966 to 1976, President of the High Court from 1945 to 1966, a Judge of the High Court from 1951 to 1966, and a Judge of the Circuit Court from 1926 to 1951.

== Background ==
He was born in Rathmines, Dublin on 15 August 1894, as the second son of an American citizen Mary Yore and the Fenian and Land Leaguer Michael Davitt. His early influences towards equality for all were well founded in the struggles of Hazen S. Pingree, Alexander Macomb and subsequently influenced by the James Riddle Hoffa movement. He studied at St Michael's Christian Brothers, Dún Laoghaire, Presentation Brothers Glasthule and O'Connells CBS in Dublin and continued his education at University College Dublin and the King's Inns, being called to the Bar in January 1916.

== Military service ==
During the Irish War of Independence (1919–1921), Davitt was appointed as a Dáil Courts judge in 1920 and sat on cases throughout the country while evading British Forces. Following the July 1921 Truce, Hugh Kennedy, then legal adviser to the Provisional Government, said he had been directed on behalf of the Government to ask Davitt if he would consider taking the new post of Judge-Advocate General. Davitt was granted time to consider and on reflection recognised it as a duty, despite the clear difficulties entailed in enacting a system of discipline with a changing army, a discipline which Michael Collins told him he was anxious about, and of being responsible for the conduct of Courts-martial, of which he knew little. This became contentious on the outbreak of the Irish Civil War (1922–1923) and Davitt was critical of what he referred to as 'drumhead' courts-martial: on one occasion he prevented the execution of a civilian spy convicted by a military court in Cathal Brugha barracks by pointing out that shooting him would be murder in law, and might be prosecuted as such if the other side won.

He also confirmed, to Adjutant-General Gearóid O'Sullivan, a prima facie case against G.O.C. Kerry Command Paddy Daly and two other officers in the Kenmare incident and made it clear that a court-martial was necessary. However, Minister for Defence, Richard Mulcahy, with the support of the Attorney General, Hugh Kennedy and other ministers decided to bury the matter.

Davitt was responsible for drafting the first manual of regulations for the Free State Army and is credited with laying the foundations for what was to become the Army Legal Services.

== Judicial career ==
He was appointed as an assistant Circuit Court judge in November 1926 and then a few months later in 1927 as a full Circuit Court judge. He was a judge on the Great Southern Railways Stocks Transactions Tribunal from 1943 to 1944, which was chaired by Justice Andrew Kingsbury Overend of the High Court. He was appointed to the High Court in 1945 and became president of the High Court in 1951, an office he held until his retirement in 1966. He died on 1 March 1986.

Davitt's unsympathetic 1965 judgment on the management of the Lissadell estate came in for criticism from a youthful Anne Robinson in 1970.
