= November 1982 Irish general election =

Election to the 24th Dáil

- 24 November 1982

166 seats in Dáil Éireann (Note: Including John O'Connell (Ind), returned automatically for Dublin South-Central as outgoing Ceann Comhairle, under Art. 16.6 of the Constitution and the Electoral Act 1963, as amended.) 84 seats needed for a majority
- Turnout: 72.9% ▼0.9 pp
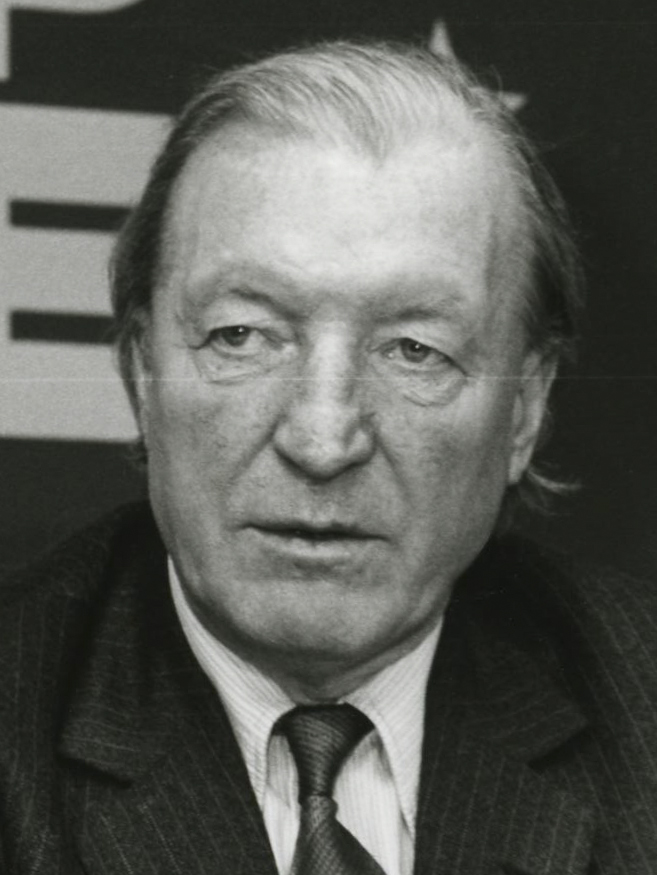

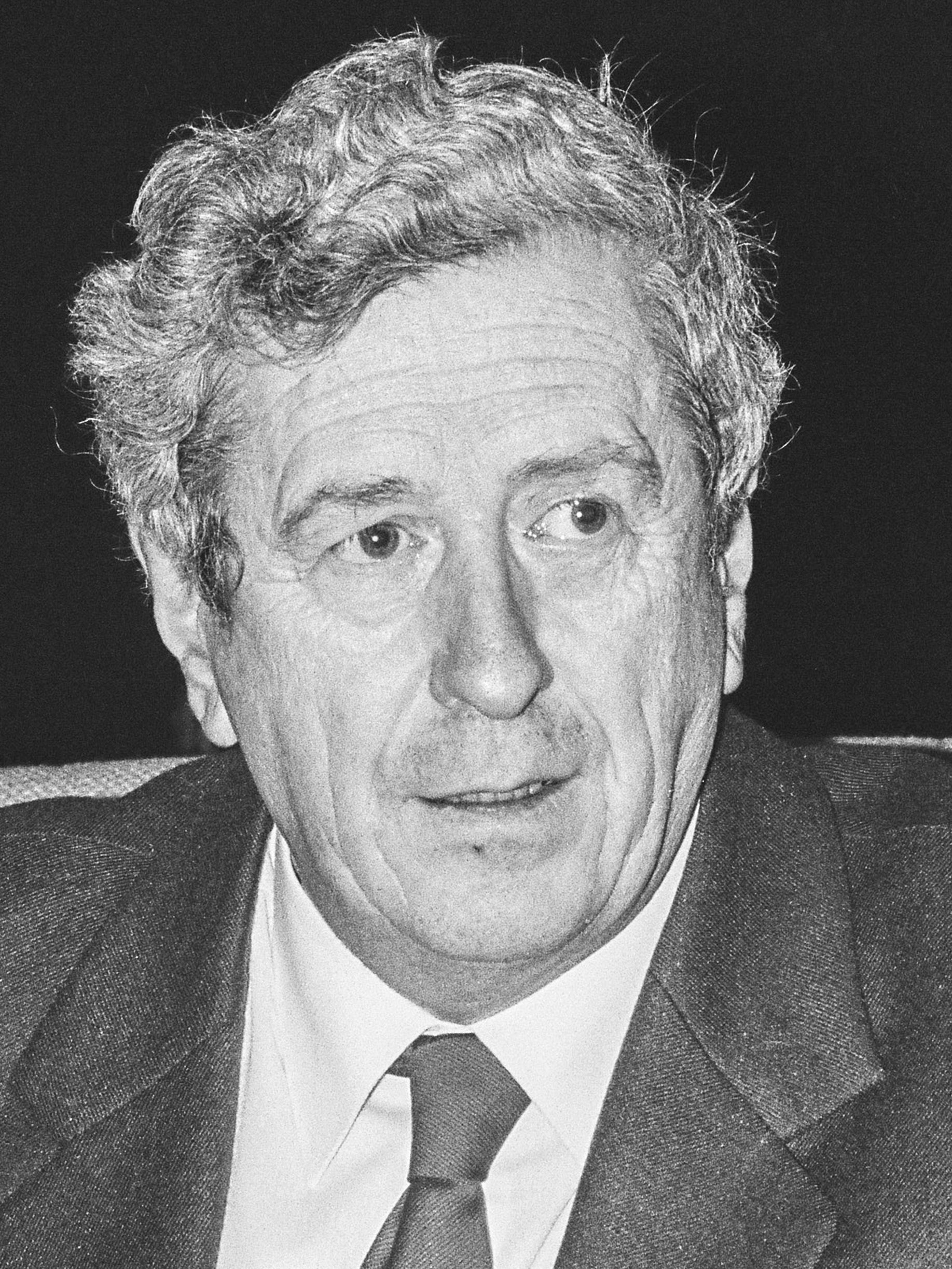

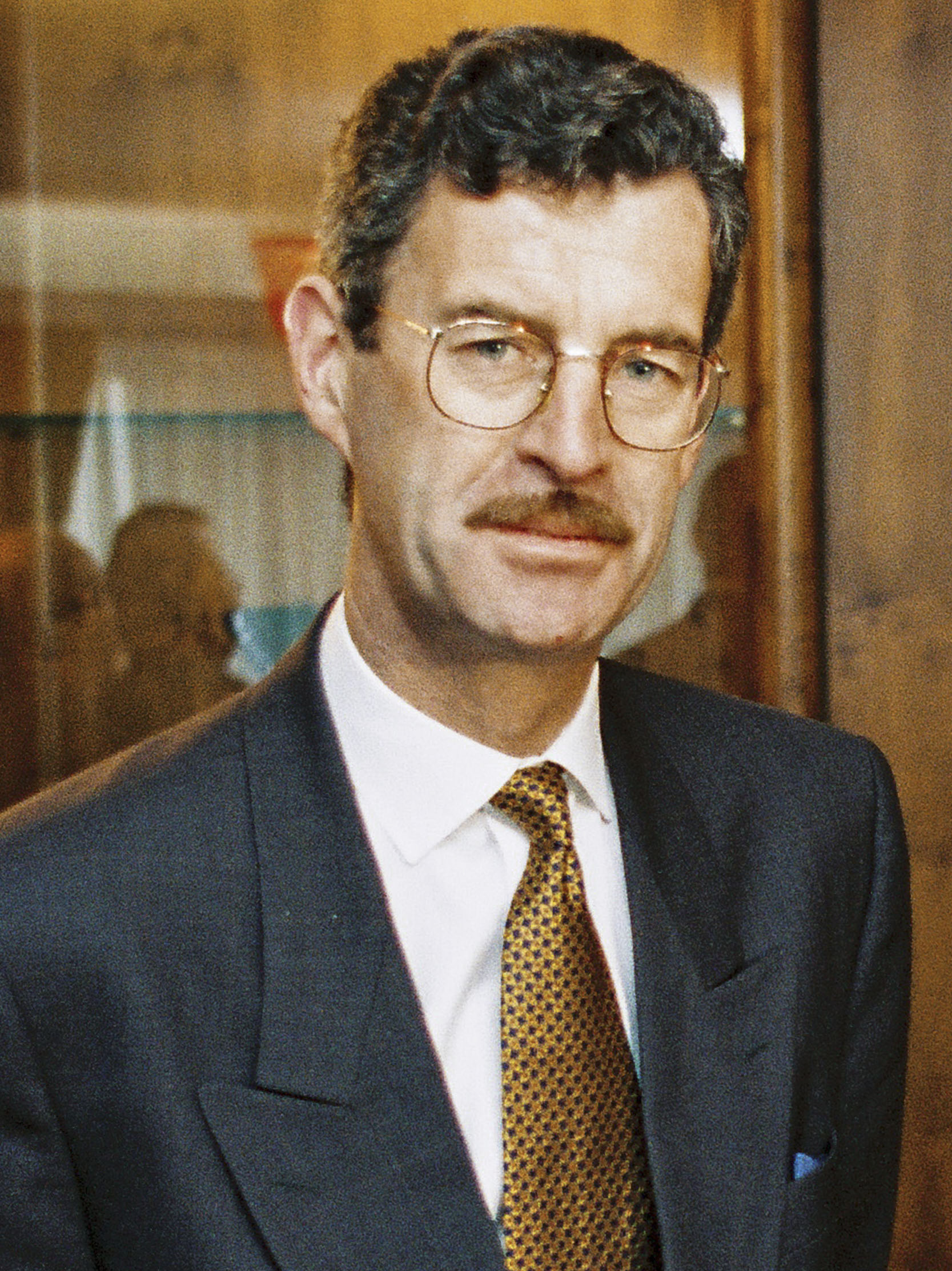

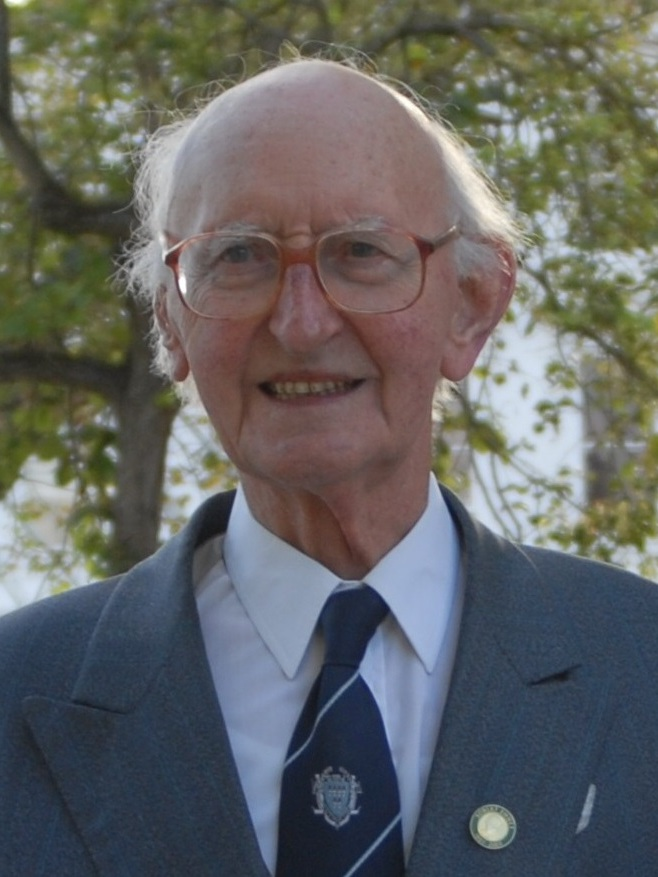
	First party	Second party
Leader	Charles Haughey	Garret FitzGerald
Party	Fianna Fáil	Fine Gael
Leader since	7 December 1979	1977
Leader's seat	Dublin North-Central	Dublin South-East
Last election	81 seats, 47.3%	63 seats, 37.3%
Seats won	75	70
Seat change	▼6	▲7
Popular vote	763,313	662,284
Percentage	45.2%	39.2%
Swing	▼2.1 pp	▲1.9 pp
	Third party	Fourth party
Leader	Dick Spring	Tomás Mac Giolla
Party	Labour	Workers' Party
Leader since	November 1982	1977
Leader's seat	Kerry North	Dublin West
Last election	15 seats, 9.1%	3 seats, 2.2%
Seats won	16	2
Seat change	▲1	▼1
Popular vote	158,115	54,888
Percentage	9.4%	3.3%
Swing	▲0.3 pp	▲1.0 pp
Taoiseach before election
Charles Haughey
Fianna Fáil
Taoiseach after election
Garret FitzGerald
Fine Gael

The November 1982 Irish general election to the 24th Dáil was held on Wednesday, 24 November, three weeks after the dissolution of the 23rd Dáil on 4 November by President Patrick Hillery, on the request of Taoiseach Charles Haughey following a defeat of the government in a motion of confidence. The general election took place in 41 Dáil constituencies throughout Ireland for 166 seats in Dáil Éireann, the house of representatives of the Oireachtas.

The 24th Dáil met at Leinster House on 14 December to nominate the Taoiseach for appointment by the president and to approve the appointment of a new government of Ireland. Garret FitzGerald was appointed Taoiseach, forming the 19th government of Ireland, a coalition government of Fine Gael and the Labour Party.

== Campaign ==
The second general election of 1982 took place just nine months after the election in February of the same year. It was the first time there had been three general elections within eighteen months.

The general election was caused by the loss of support of the Independent TD Tony Gregory and the Workers' Party for the Fianna Fáil government. This was due to the government introducing substantial budget cuts, which the left-wing TDs would not support. While economic issues dominated the campaign, the parties were weary of having to fight yet another general election.

== Result ==
Election to the 24th Dáil – 24 November 1982
Party	Leader	Seats	±	% of seats	First pref. votes	% FPv	±%
Fianna Fáil	Charles Haughey	75	–6	45.2	763,313	45.2	–2.1
Fine Gael	Garret FitzGerald	70	+7	42.2	662,284	39.2	+1.9
Labour	Dick Spring	16	+1	9.6	158,115	9.4	+0.3
Workers' Party	Tomás Mac Giolla	2	–1	1.2	54,888	3.3	+1.0
Democratic Socialist	Jim Kemmy	0	New	0	7,012	0.4	–
Green		0	New	0	3,716	0.2	–
Irish Republican Socialist	Jim Lane	0	0	0	398	0.0	-0.2
Communist	Eugene McCartan	0	0	0	259	0.0	0
Independent	N/A	3	–1	1.2	38,735	2.3	–0.5
Spoilt votes					12,665	—N/a	—N/a
Total		166	0	100	1,701,385	100	—N/a
Electorate/Turnout					2,335,153	72.9%	—N/a

Independents include Independent Fianna Fáil (7,997 votes, 1 seat).

=== Voting summary ===
First preference vote
Fianna Fáil	45.20%
Fine Gael	39.22%
Labour	9.36%
Workers'	3.25%
Others	0.67%
Independent	2.29%

=== Seats summary ===
Dáil seats
Fianna Fáil	45.18%
Fine Gael	42.17%
Labour	9.64%
Workers'	1.20%
Independent	1.81%

== Government formation ==
Fine Gael and the Labour Party formed the 19th government of Ireland, a majority coalition.

Fine Gael won 39.2% of the vote, the highest ever in its history. It also recorded its best election result until 2011, coming within five seats of Fianna Fáil; at other times (such as 1977) Fianna Fáil had been twice as big as Fine Gael. The Labour Party had a new leader with Dick Spring. A programme for government was quickly drawn up and Garret FitzGerald of Fine Gael became Taoiseach for the second time. The poor showing for Fianna Fáil resulted in a leadership challenge to Charles Haughey by his opponents within the party. Haughey won the vote of confidence and remained as leader.

== Dáil membership changes ==
The following changes took place as a result of the election:

- 5 outgoing TDs retired
- 1 vacant seat at election time
- 159 outgoing TDs stood for re-election (also John O'Connell, the outgoing Ceann Comhairle who was automatically returned)
  - 138 of those were re-elected
  - 21 failed to be re-elected
- 27 successor TDs were elected
  - 18 were elected for the first time
  - 9 had previously been TDs
- There were 6 successor female TDs, increasing the total by 6 to 14.
- There were changes in 22 of the 41 constituencies contested

Where more than one change took place in a constituency the concept of successor is an approximation for presentation only.

Constituency	Departing TD	Party	Change	Comment	Successor TD	Party
Carlow–Kilkenny	Jim Gibbons	Fianna Fáil	Lost seat		M. J. Nolan	Fianna Fáil
Carlow–Kilkenny	Desmond Governey	Fine Gael	Retired		Dick Dowling	Fine Gael
Cavan–Monaghan	No membership changes					
Clare	Bill Loughnane	Fianna Fáil	Vacant (Note: Loughnane died in October, some weeks before the general election.)	Taylor-Quinn: Former TD	Madeleine Taylor-Quinn	Fine Gael
Cork East	Joe Sherlock	Workers' Party	Lost seat		Ned O'Keeffe	Fianna Fáil
Cork East	Seán French	Fianna Fáil	Lost seat		Dan Wallace	Fianna Fáil
Cork North-Central	No membership changes					
Cork North-West	Thomas Meaney	Fianna Fáil	Retired		Donal Moynihan	Fianna Fáil
Cork South-Central	Jim Corr	Fine Gael	Retired	Coveney: Former TD	Hugh Coveney	Fine Gael
Cork South-West	No membership changes					
Donegal North-East	No membership changes					
Donegal South-West	No membership changes					
Dublin Central	Michael O'Leary	Fine Gael	Moved	O'Leary moved to Dublin Central, Glenn: Former TD	Alice Glenn	Fine Gael
Dublin North	No membership changes					
Dublin North-Central	No membership changes					
Dublin North-East	Ned Brennan	Fianna Fáil	Lost seat	Fitzgerald: Former TD	Liam Fitzgerald	Fianna Fáil
Dublin North-West	No membership changes					
Dublin South	No membership changes					
Dublin South-Central	Tom Fitzpatrick	Fianna Fáil	Lost seat	O'Brien: Former TD	Fergus O'Brien	Fine Gael
Dublin South-East	Alexis Fitzgerald	Fine Gael	Lost seat		Joe Doyle	Fine Gael
Dublin South-West	Larry McMahon	Fine Gael	Lost seat		Michael O'Leary	Fine Gael
Dublin West	Brian Fleming	Fine Gael	Lost seat		Tomas Mac Giolla	Workers' Party
Dublin West	Liam Lawlor	Fianna Fáil	Lost seat	Lemass: Former TD	Eileen Lemass	Fianna Fáil
Dún Laoghaire	Martin O'Donoghue	Fianna Fáil	Lost seat		Monica Barnes	Fine Gael
Galway East	No membership changes					
Galway West	Michael D. Higgins	Labour Party	Lost seat		Fintan Coogan Jnr	Fine Gael
Kerry North	No membership changes					
Kerry South	No membership changes					
Kildare	Gerry Brady	Fianna Fáil	Lost seat	Durkan: Former TD	Bernard Durkan	Fine Gael
Laois–Offaly	No membership changes					
Limerick East	Jim Kemmy	Democratic Socialist Party	Lost seat		Frank Prendergast	Labour Party
Limerick West	No membership changes					
Longford–Westmeath	Seán Keegan	Fianna Fáil	Lost seat		Mary O'Rourke	Fianna Fáil
Louth	Thomas Bellew	Fianna Fáil	Lost seat		Michael Bell	Labour Party
Louth	Eddie Filgate	Fianna Fáil	Retired		Séamus Kirk	Fianna Fáil
Louth	Bernard Markey	Fine Gael	Lost seat		Brendan McGahon	Fine Gael
Mayo East	No membership changes					
Mayo West	No membership changes					
Meath	Michael Lynch	Fianna Fáil	Lost seat		Frank McLoughlin	Labour Party
Roscommon	No membership changes					
Sligo–Leitrim	John Ellis	Fianna Fáil	Lost seat	McCartin: Former TD	Joe McCartin	Fine Gael
Tipperary North	No membership changes					
Tipperary South	No membership changes					
Waterford	Patrick Gallagher	Workers' Party	Lost seat		Donal Ormonde	Fianna Fáil
Wexford	Lorcan Allen	Fianna Fáil	Lost seat		Avril Doyle	Fine Gael
Wexford	Seán Browne	Fianna Fáil	Retired		John Browne	Fianna Fáil
Wicklow	Ciarán Murphy	Fianna Fáil	Lost seat	Brennan: Former TD	Paudge Brennan	Fianna Fáil

== Seanad election ==
The Dáil election was followed in early 1983 by an election to the 17th Seanad.
