= February 1982 Irish general election =

Election to the 23rd Dáil

- 18 February 1982

166 seats in Dáil Éireann (Note: Including John O'Connell (Ind), returned automatically for Dublin South-Central as outgoing Ceann Comhairle, under Art. 16.6 of the Constitution and the Electoral Act 1963, as amended.) 84 seats needed for a majority
- Turnout: 73.8% ▼2.4 pp
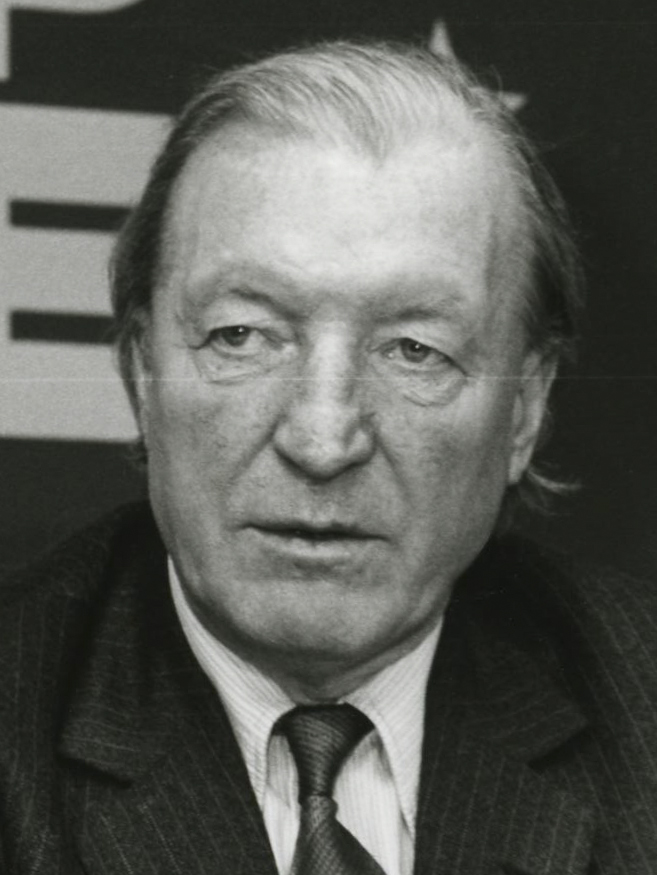

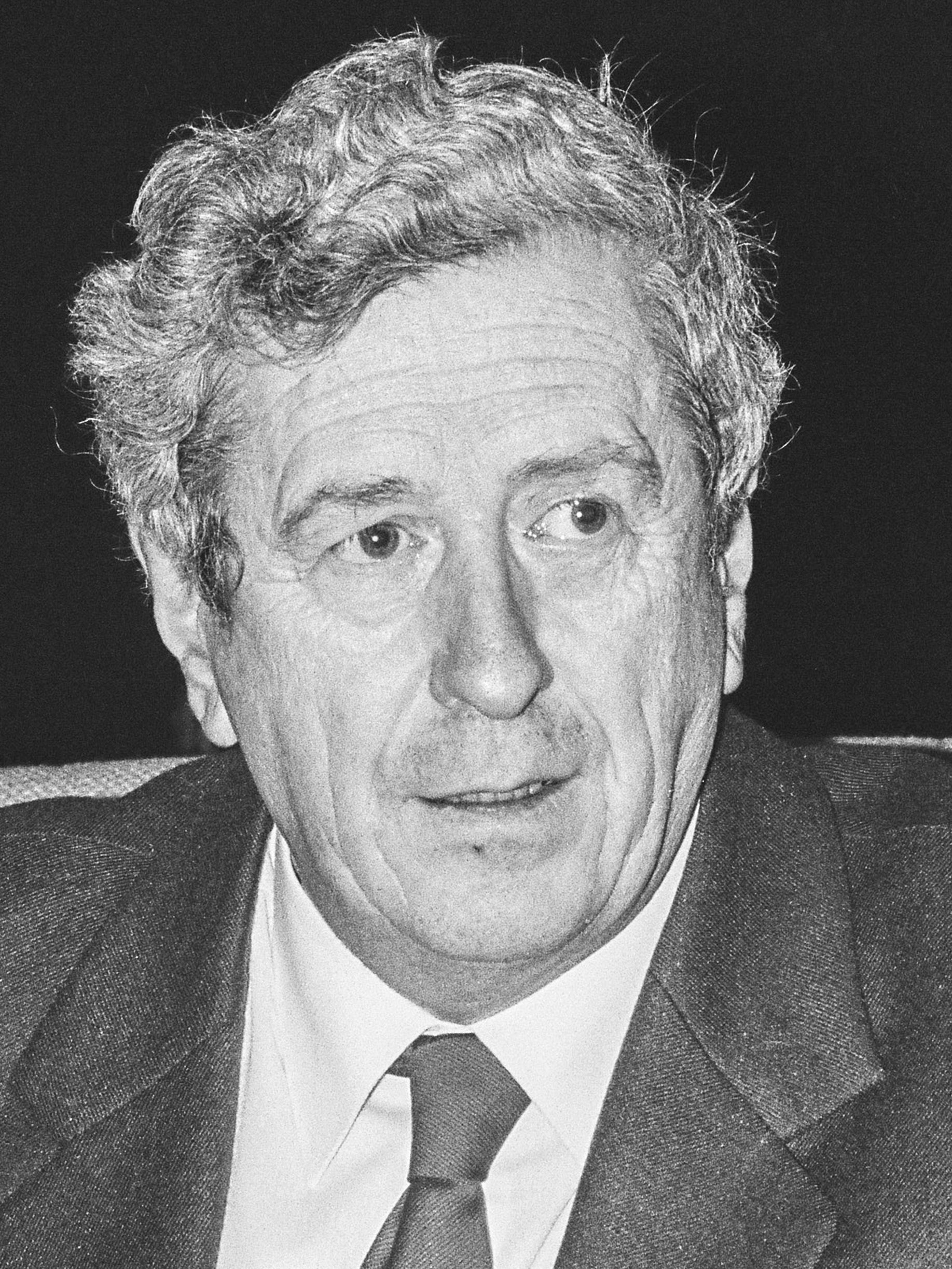

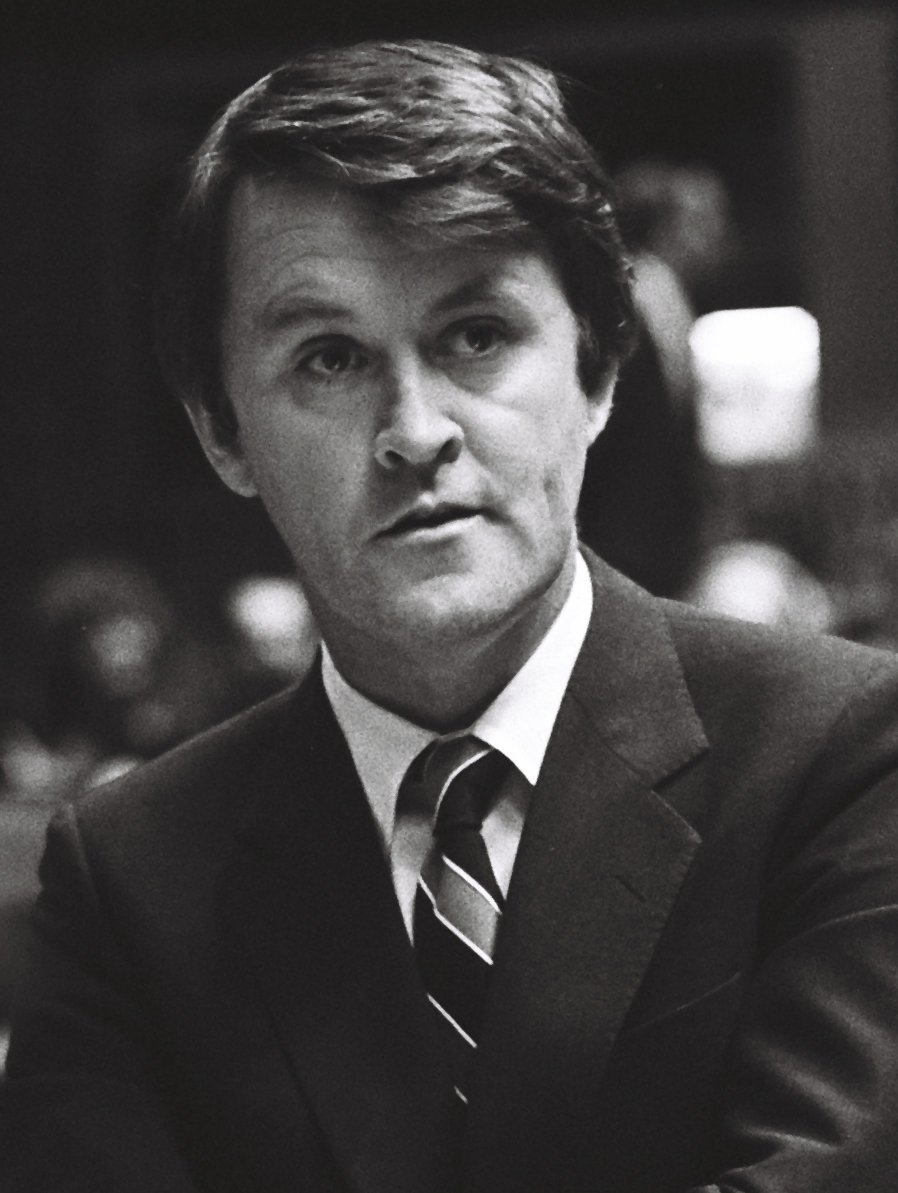

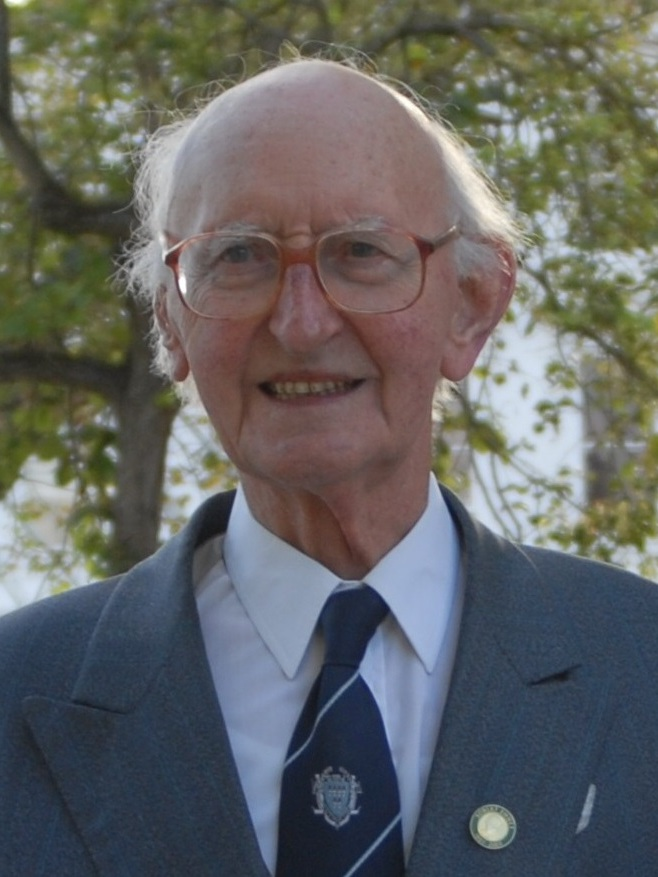
	First party	Second party
Leader	Charles Haughey	Garret FitzGerald
Party	Fianna Fáil	Fine Gael
Leader since	7 December 1979	1977
Leader's seat	Dublin North-Central	Dublin South-East
Last election	78 seats, 45.3%	65 seats, 36.5%
Seats won	81	63
Seat change	▲3	▼2
Popular vote	786,851	621,088
Percentage	47.3%	37.3%
Swing	▲2.0 pp	▲0.8 pp
	Third party	Fourth party
Leader	Michael O'Leary	Tomás Mac Giolla
Party	Labour	Sinn Féin The Workers' Party
Leader since	1981	1977
Leader's seat	Dublin Central	N/A
Last election	15 seats, 9.9%	1 seat, 1.7%
Seats won	15	3
Seat change	Steady	▲2
Popular vote	151,875	38,088
Percentage	9.1%	2.3%
Swing	▼0.8 pp	▲0.6 pp
Taoiseach before election
Garret FitzGerald
Fine Gael
Taoiseach after election
Charles Haughey
Fianna Fáil

The February 1982 Irish general election to the 23rd Dáil was held on Thursday, 18 February, three weeks after the dissolution of the 22nd Dáil on 27 January by President Patrick Hillery on the request of Taoiseach Garret FitzGerald on the defeat of the government's budget. The general election took place in 41 Dáil constituencies throughout Ireland for 166 seats in Dáil Éireann, the house of representatives of the Oireachtas.

The 23rd Dáil met at Leinster House on 9 March to nominate the Taoiseach for appointment by the president and to approve the appointment of a new government of Ireland. Charles Haughey was appointed Taoiseach, forming the 18th government of Ireland, a minority single-party Fianna Fáil government.

== Background ==
The first general election of 1982 was caused by the sudden collapse of the Fine Gael–Labour Party coalition government when the budget was defeated. The Minister for Finance, John Bruton, attempted to put VAT on children's shoes. This measure was rejected by Jim Kemmy, a left-wing independent Teachta Dála, and Joe Sherlock of Sinn Féin The Workers' Party.

=== Dissolution of the Dáil ===
On 27 January 1982 Taoiseach Garret FitzGerald sought an immediate dissolution of the Dáil following the collapse of his minority government. While FitzGerald met with President Patrick Hillery at Áras an Uachtaráin, several Fianna Fáil members (including party leader Charles Haughey and former Foreign Minister Brian Lenihan Snr) attempted to contact the president. Their aim was to persuade Hillery to deny the dissolution, which would have forced FitzGerald to resign and allowed the Dáil to nominate a new Taoiseach, paving the way for Haughey's potential return to office.

The attempts to influence Hillery were unconstitutional, as the president is bound to act only on the advice of the Taoiseach in such matters and must otherwise act independently under the constitutional principle of "as a chomhairle féin" or "under his own counsel". Hillery, angered by the interference, rejected the overtures. Allegations later emerged that Haughey had threatened Hillery's aide-de-camp, Captain Anthony Barber, after being denied access to the president.

Ultimately, Hillery upheld his constitutional obligations and granted FitzGerald the dissolution, triggering a general election campaign. In a protective gesture, Hillery ordered a note to be placed on Barber's service record to shield him from potential retribution.

== Campaign ==
The campaign was dominated by economic issues, with all parties downplaying the necessity of spending cuts despite the country's severe fiscal challenges. Fianna Fáil, under Charles Haughey, initially dismissed the need for austerity, presenting policies focused on increasing disposable income for families. Their message resonated with voters, earning headlines such as "FF’s family budget" in the Evening Echo on February 12. However, as the campaign progressed, the need for more realistic measures became evident, and Fianna Fáil pivoted towards policies resembling those already implemented by Fine Gael during its time in office. Garret FitzGerald, leading Fine Gael, criticised Fianna Fáil's initial proposals as "myopic".

== Result ==
The election results revealed a closely fought contest. Although Fianna Fáil won the largest number of seats, securing 81 out of the 84 needed for a majority, the outcome was not decisive. The Evening Echo in Cork reflected the tight result with the headline "Trend to FF, but FG fight back".

Election to the 23rd Dáil – 18 February 1982
Party	Leader	Seats	±	% of seats	First pref. votes	% FPv	±%
Fianna Fáil	Charles Haughey	81	+3	48.8	786,951	47.3	+2.0
Fine Gael	Garret FitzGerald	63	–2	38.0	621,088	37.3	+0.8
Labour	Michael O'Leary	15	0	9.0	151,875	9.1	–0.8
Sinn Féin The Workers' Party	Tomás Mac Giolla	3	+2	1.8	38,088	2.3	+0.6
Sinn Féin	Ruairí Ó Brádaigh	0	New	0	16,894	1.0	–
Irish Republican Socialist		0	New	0	2,716	0.2	–
Communist		0	0	0	462	0.0	0
Independent	N/A	4	0	2.4	46,059	2.8	–0.9
Spoilt votes					14,367	—N/a	—N/a
Total		166	0	100	1,678,500	100	—N/a
Electorate/Turnout					2,275,450	73.8%	—N/a

Independents include Independent Fianna Fáil (11,732 votes, 1 seat).

=== Voting summary ===
First preference vote
Fianna Fáil	47.26%
Fine Gael	37.30%
Labour	9.12%
Sinn Féin (Workers' Party)	2.29%
Sinn Féin	1.01%
Others	0.19%
Independent	2.77%

=== Seats summary ===
Dáil seats
Fianna Fáil	48.80%
Fine Gael	37.95%
Labour	9.04%
Sinn Féin (Workers' Party)	1.81%
Independent	2.41%

== Government formation ==
Fianna Fáil emerged from the election as the largest party and appeared most likely to form a government. However, internal divisions within the party threatened Charles Haughey's bid for Taoiseach. Despite speculation about a potential leadership challenge by Desmond O'Malley, which ultimately failed to materialise, Haughey was confirmed as the party's nominee. To secure the necessary support for his return to office, Fianna Fáil struck a deal with socialist TD Tony Gregory, Independent Fianna Fáil TD Neil Blaney, and the three Sinn Féin The Workers' Party deputies, including Joe Sherlock. With this backing, Haughey was appointed Taoiseach, allowing Fianna Fáil to form a government, the 18th Government of Ireland.

== Dáil membership changes ==
The following changes took place as a result of the election:

- 7 outgoing TDs retired
- 1 vacant seat at election time
- 157 outgoing TDs stood for re-election (also John O'Connell, the outgoing Ceann Comhairle, who was automatically returned)
  - 136 of those were re-elected
  - 21 failed to be re-elected
- 29 successor TDs were elected
  - 21 were elected for the first time
  - 8 had previously been TDs
- There was 1 successor female TD, who replaced 4 outgoing; thus the total decreased by 3 to 8.
- There were changes in 26 of 41 constituencies

Where more than one change took place in a constituency the concept of successor is an approximation for presentation only.

Constituency	Departing TD	Party	Change	Comment	Successor TD	Party
Carlow–Kilkenny	Tom Nolan	Fianna Fáil	Lost seat	Gibbons: Former TD	Jim Gibbons	Fianna Fáil
Cavan–Monaghan	Kieran Doherty	Anti H-Block	Vacant (Note: Doherty died in August 1981 but no by-election had been called by the time of the general election.)	Leonard: Former TD	Jimmy Leonard	Fianna Fáil
Clare	Madeline Taylor	Fine Gael	Lost seat		Donal Carey	Fine Gael
Cork East	Carey Joyce	Fianna Fáil	Lost seat		Michael Ahern	Fianna Fáil
Cork North-Central	No membership changes					
Cork North-West	No membership changes					
Cork South-Central	Hugh Coveney	Fine Gael	Lost seat		Jim Corr	Fine Gael
Cork South-West	Flor Crowley	Fianna Fáil	Lost seat	Walsh:Former TD	Joe Walsh	Fianna Fáil
Donegal North-East	No membership changes					
Donegal South-West	James White	Fine Gael	Retired		Dinny McGinley	Fine Gael
Dublin Central	Alice Glenn	Fine Gael	Lost seat		Tony Gregory	Independent
Dublin North	No membership changes					
Dublin North-Central	Noël Browne	Socialist Labour Party	Retired		Richard Bruton	Fine Gael
Dublin North-East	Liam Fitzgerald	Fianna Fáil	Lost seat		Ned Brennan	Fianna Fáil
Dublin North-East	Seán Loftus	Independent	Lost seat		Maurice Manning	Fine Gael
Dublin North-West	Hugh Byrne	Fine Gael	Lost seat		Proinsias De Rossa	Sinn Féin The Workers' Party
Dublin South	No membership changes					
Dublin South-Central	Fergus O'Brien	Fine Gael	Lost seat	Cluskey:Former TD	Frank Cluskey	Labour Party
Dublin South-East	Seán Moore	Fianna Fáil	Lost seat	Quinn:Former TD	Ruairi Quinn	Labour Party
Dublin South-East	Richie Ryan	Fine Gael	Retired		Alexis FitzGerald Jnr	Fine Gael
Dublin South-West	No membership changes					
Dublin West	Eileen Lemass	Fianna Fáil	Lost seat	Lawlor:Former TD	Liam Lawlor	Fianna Fáil
Dún Laoghaire	No membership changes					
Galway East	No membership changes					
Galway West	Mark Killilea Jnr	Fianna Fáil	Lost seat		Frank Fahey	Fianna Fáil
Kerry North	No membership changes					
Kerry South	No membership changes					
Kildare	Bernard Durkan	Fine Gael	Lost seat		Gerry Brady	Fianna Fáil
Laois–Offaly	No membership changes					
Limerick East	Peadar Clohessy	Fianna Fáil	Lost seat		Willie O'Dea	Fianna Fáil
Limerick West	No membership changes					
Longford–Westmeath	No membership changes					
Louth	Paddy Agnew	Anti H-Block	Retired		Thomas Bellew	Fianna Fáil
Mayo East	No membership changes					
Mayo West	No membership changes					
Meath	Brendan Crinion	Fianna Fáil	Retired		Colm Hilliard	Fianna Fáil
Meath	James Tully	Labour Party	Retired		Michael Lynch	Fianna Fáil
Roscommon	John Connor	Fine Gael	Lost seat		Liam Naughten	Fine Gael
Sligo–Leitrim	Joe McCartin	Fine Gael	Lost seat		Matt Brennan	Fianna Fáil
Tipperary North	Michael Smith	Fianna Fáil	Lost seat	Kennedy:Former TD	Michael O'Kennedy	Fianna Fáil
Tipperary South	Carrie Acheson	Fianna Fáil	Lost seat		Seán Byrne	Fianna Fáil
Waterford	Billy Kenneally	Fianna Fáil	Lost seat		Patrick Gallagher	Sinn Féin The Workers' Party
Wexford	Brendan Corish	Labour Party	Retired	Browne:Former TD	Seán Browne	Fianna Fáil
Wicklow	Paudge Brennan	Fianna Fáil	Lost seat		Gemma Hussey	Fine Gael

== Seanad election ==
The Dáil election was followed by an election to the 16th Seanad.
