= Tenure (disambiguation) =

Tenure may refer to:

- Academic tenure, indefinite academic position
- Housing tenure, arrangement for the right to live in a house or apartment
- Land tenure, legal ownership of land
- Incumbent, political tenure
- Tenure (film), a 2009 comedy-drama

== See also ==
- Tinure, a village in County Louth, Ireland
