= List of place names for County Louth =

This is a list of the historical names for 'Louth', the village and county in Ireland. The Placenames Branch, Dept. of Arts, Heritage and the Gaeltacht undertakes research into the placenames of Ireland to provide authoritative Irish language versions of those placenames for official and public use. Below are from surviving records are a result of their research.

== Native sources ==
Native sources (Irish and Latin) from 6th - 19th century.

Year	Reference	Source	Page
534	S. Mochta, espucc Lughmhaigh (Níl sé seo comhaimseartha)	ARÉ	I, 176
662	Scandlan abbas Lugbaid	ATig.	xvii, 197
662	Scannlan, abb Lughmaidh, quieuit	AU	134
693	Gaimide Lugmhaidh décc.	ARÉ	296
693	Gaimide Lugmhaidh décc	ARÉ	I, 296
695	Gaimide Lugmaidh dormiuit	AU	156
737	Cuidgheal, ab 7 scribhnidh Lughmhaidh	ARÉ	I, 338
742	Mors Cuidgile, scribae 7 abbatis Lughmaidh	AU	196
750c.	Nirbo boctai do Mochta Lugbaid liss	FOeng.	cxxxii, 19 Aug.
753	Muireadhach, mac Corbmaic Slaine, abb Lughmhaidh	ARÉ	I, 356
754	Coissetach, abb Lughmhaidh	ARÉ	I, 356
758	Gorman comurba Mochta Lugbaidh	ATig.	xvii, 258
758	[Muredach mac Cormaic] Slane, ab Lughmuidh	ATig.	xvii, 258
758	Muiredach m. Cormaic abbas Lughmaidh	AU	210
759	Mors Coisetig ab Lugbaidh	ATig.	xvii, 259
770	Dondghal, mac Nuadhad, abb Lughmhaidh	ARÉ	I, 372
775	Donngal m. Nuadhat abbas Lugmaidh	AU	228
775	Fianchu abbas Lugmaidh	AU	228
784	Feadhach, mac Corbmaic, abb Lughmhaidh, Slaine 7 Doimliag	ARÉ	I, 390
789	Fedhach m. Cormaic abbas Lughmaidh	AU	244
797	Cosccrach Ua Fraoich, abb Lughmhaidh	ARÉ	I, 404
800c	vita sancti Moctei Lubgunensis (Lat.)	VSH (Heist)	394
800c	ad Lubgudunense monasterium (Lat.)	VSH (Heist)	200
800c	ad locum qui dicitur Lugmod	VSH (Heist)	250
800c	ad locum nomine Lugmud	VSH (Heist)	396
800c	ad locum qui dicitur Lugmath	VSH (Heist)	200
800c	in civitate Lugmith (gen.)	VSH (Heist)	200
802	Coscrach nepos Froich abbas Lughmaidh	AU	256
810	Maolcanaigh, angcoire Lughmhaidh	ARÉ	I, 422
815	Mael Canaigh ancorita Lugmaidh	AU	270
818	Cuanu abbas Lugmaidh co scrin Mochtai do dul a tire Muman for longais	AU	274
818	Scrín Mochta Lugmaid for teched re nAed mc. Neill co mbui i lLis Mor	AIF	124
820	Eocha Ua Tuathail, angcoire epscop, 7 abb Lughmhaidh	ARÉ	I, 430
822	Euchu nepos Tuathail, ancorita & episcopus Lugmaid dormiuit	_	278
823	Cuana Lughmhaidh, eagnaidh 7 epscop	ARÉ	I, 434
825	Cuanu Lugmaidh, sapiens 7 episcopus dormiuit	AU	280
830	Orgain Lughmhaidh, 7 Mucshnamha 7 Ua Meith	ARÉ	I, 444
830c	Mochta Lugmaid	M.Tall.	26 s. 24 Mar.
830c	Mochta Lugmaid	M.Tall.	62 s.19 Aug.
832	Orggain Mucshnama 7 Lughmaidh 7 Oa Meith 7 Droma moccu Blae 7 ala n-aile ceall	AU	288
834	Aodhagan mac Torbaigh abb Lucchmhaidh	ARÉ	I, 448
839	Orgain Lughmhaidh la Galloibh Locha hEathach	ARÉ	I, 460
840	Orggain Lughmaidh di Loch Echdach o genntibh	AU	298
862	Muiredhach mac Néill ab Lughmhaidh 7 ceall naile	ARÉ	I, 498
864	Muridach m. Neill abbas Lughmaidh	AU	864
871	Maoltuili Cluana huinnseann abb Lughmhaidh	ARÉ	I, 516
898	Caenchomhrac Insi Endoimh, epscop 7 abb Lughmaidh	ARÉ	I, 556
903	Caincomruc episcopus 7 princeps Lugmhaid	AU	352
908	Mael Martain princeps Lughmaidh	AU	356
908c	Is ed dochóid Patraic íarsin do Ardd Patraic fri Lugmag anoir	B.Phát.	135, l. 2680
908c	Ticed Mochtae aníar ó Lugmag	B.Phát.	146, l.2931
908c	do Lugmag	B.Phát.	146, l.2931
928	Flann Fobhair, abb Lughmhaidh	ARÉ	II, 622
936	Maolpatraicc .i. mac Broin, epscop Lughmhaidh	ARÉ	II, 634
948	Finnachta mac Echtighern, epscop, scribhnidh, & abb Lughmhaidh	ARÉ	II, 660
968	Orgain Lughmaidh 7 Droma Inescclainn la Muirehertach mac Domhnaill	ARÉ	II, 692
986	Gaoth mhór anacnata go ro thrascair iol chumhtaighthe 7 teaghdaisi iomdha im dertigh Lughmaidh	ARÉ	II, 720
987	im durtheach Lughmaidhe (v.l. lugh muighe)	ATig.	xvii, 345
1011	Martán abb Lucchmhaidh	ARÉ	II, 764
1043	Creach lá hAnnudh Ua Ruairc dar Lughmhadh dat Druim Inesclainn 7 dar Conaille uile	ARÉ	II, 842
1043	Crechsluaigheadh le hAndadh Hua Ruairc tar Lughmadh (v.l. lughmagh) & Druim n-Indasclaind	ATig.	xvii, 382
1044	Maelmochta, espug Lughmhaidh	ARÉ	II, 844
1044	Mael Mochta espoc Lugmaidh (v.l. lugmuigh)	ATig.	xvii, 383
1045	Maenach H. Cirduban airchinnech Lughmaidh	AU	482
1045	Maonach Ua Ciordubháin, comharba Mochta Lughmhaidh	ARÉ	II, 848
1047	Gillamolaissi ferléighind Lughmaidh	ARÉ	II, 850
1050c	Dointaí íarom Óengus mac Oénláma Caíme, óclach dána di Ultaib, in slóg n-ule oc Modaib Loga – is inund ón dano & Lugmod "Then Óengus mac Oénláma Caíme, a bold warrior of the Ulstermen, turned back the whole army at Moda Loga (which is the same name as Lugmod)"	_	2489-91
1065	Domnall airchinnech Lughbaidh	AU	502
1065	Domhnall airchinneach Lucchmhaidh	ARÉ	II, 886
1075	Lughmhadh do losccadh co na teampull	ARÉ	II, 906
1081	Flann H. Lorcan uasalshacart Lughbaidh	AU	516
1081	Flann Ua Lorcáin, uasal shacart Lughmhaidh	ARÉ	II, 916
1081	Ua Robhartaigh, airchinneach Lughmaidh	ARÉ	II, 916
1083	Gilla Moninne airchinnech Lugbaidh occisus est	AU	516
1083	Giollamoninne, airchinnech Lughmhaidh	ARÉ	II, 918
1100c	Mochta .i. escop Lugbaid	FOeng.	cxxxii, 19 Aug.
1100c	Mochta credal craibdech .i. Llugmad	FOeng.	lxv, 24 Mar n.
1102	Muiredhach H. Cirduban airchinnech Lughbaidh do mharbadh do feraibh Midhe beus	AU	540
1102	Muireadhach Ua Cíordhubhain, airchinneach Lughmhaidh.	ARÉ	II, 970
1111	Lughmhadh do losccadh	ARÉ	II, 990
1111	Lugmadh do loscadh	AU	550
1111	Cenannus & Lughmadh (MS. lughmagh) do loscadh	ATig.	xviii, 30
1123	Flann Ua Duibhinsi, airchindeach Lughmhaidh	ARÉ	II, 1016
1123	Flann H. Duibhinnsi airchinnech Lughmaigh	AU	568
1128	Fir Brebni dacutar for crec Conelle Murtimne cur argset Lugbuth	AIF	1128
1128	Móir chreach la Connachtaibh i fFearnmhaigh, 7 ro oirccsead an tír 7 Lughmhadh	ARÉ	II, 1030
1133	Ros Cré 7 Lúghmhagh do losccadh	ARÉ	II, 1042
1147	Fiachra Mac Muireadhaigh, airchindeach Lughmhaidh frí ré	ARÉ	II, 1080
1148	Cluain Earaird, Land Leire 7 Lughmhadh do losccadh	ARÉ	II, 1084
1148	i Lughmhadh	ARÉ	II, 1082
1149	Ríghthearas lá mac Néill Uí Loghlainn co marcshluagh Chenél Eocchain co Lughmhadh	ARÉ	II, 1090
1150c	imsóe reme na sluagu a Modaib Loga risi ráiter Lugmud in tan sa "he drove the hosts before him from Moda Loga, which is now called Lugmud"	_	2441
1160	Lúghmhadh 7 Ceanncoradh do loscadh	ARÉ	II, 1136
1164	Losccadh Lughmhaidh	ARÉ	II, 1152
1164	Maelchaoimhghin Ua Gormáin, maighistir Lughmaidh ard shaoi Ereann 7 abb canánach Tearmainn Fechine fri ré	ARÉ	II, 1152
1166	Cenannus & Lughmagh (v.l. Lugbud) crematae sunt	AU	152
1166	Lughbhadh, Suird Cholaim Chille 7 Ard Bó do losccadh	ARÉ	II, 1158
1176	Lughmadh do fhasughadh do na Saxaibh	AU	182
1176	Lughmhagh do fhasughadh do Saxaibh	ARÉ	III, 22
1178	Creach fill la Milis Gogan 7 la Gallaibh Atha Cliath 7 na Midir for Lugmadh 7 for Machaire Conaill	MIA	66
1181	Maolmuire ua Dunain abb Cnuic na Seangan hi Lughmagh do écc	ARÉ	III, 56
1196	Ludhmagh d’argain 7 do loscadh	MIA	76
1242	Caibitil mhór lé Prímhaidh Arda Macha 7 la abbadhaibh cananach Ereann i Lughmhadh dia ro togbhadh moran do thaisibh do thionoil Mochta ón Róimh	ARÉ	III, 304
1242	i lLugmad	AConn.	76
1315	hic lucimag (= ic Lugmag)(acc).	AConn.	232
1315	scilicet Ath Fir Diad 7 Lugud	AIF	418
1328	Sir Seon Mac Feorais Iarla Lugmaigh	AConn.	264
1328	Sir Seon Mac Feorais Iarla Lugmaigh, aon bharún ba beodha, bhrioghmaire, /agus ba ferr oinech do Ghallaibh Ereann, do marbhadh i ffell da muintir /fein .i. do Gallaibh Oirgiall, agus sochaidhe imaille ris do Ghallaibh /agus do Gaoidhelaibh.	ARÉ	3, 538
1371	Marbadh Briain moir Meg Mathghamhna iar fír & a adnacul a Maínistir Lughbhaid	AU	556
1396	Gallprioir do bheith i Lubha (n.2 ‘sic’)	MIA	156
1422	cur millsed Lugmad ex parte magna	AConn.	464
1423	Ocus do cuadar go Lughmadh	AU	3, 94
1423	Aseadh lotar cetus co Traigh Bhaile co machaire Oirghiall go Lughmagh, agus assidhe gus an Midhe.	ARÉ	858
1450c	Is ann sin ro ionnsaig oclach dána d’Ultaib na sluaigh darbo comainm Oengus mac Aonlaime Gabaidh & do-cuaid resna sluagaib as Muighibh Loga frisa n-abartar Lughmagh in tan so	_	2434-6
1522	Maighister Feidhlimidh O Corcrain .....a adhlucudh a Lughbaidh	AU	3, 548
1532	Sen-Mochta Lugmaid	BCC	24
1578	Tomas mac Pattraic mic Oiliuéir Ploingcéd tighearna Luchcmaigh do mharbhadh lá Mag Mathghamhna	ARÉ	IV, 1708
1630	i ccondae Luth Strabaile	FNÉ	xlvi
1630	Maolmuire Ua Gormáin, abb Lughmaigh	FNÉ	186 3 July
1630	Maccridhe, .i. mac craidhe Mochta Lughmaigh	FNÉ	216, 11 August
1630	Mochta, epscop Lughmaigh	FNÉ	222, 19 August
1647	in loco ...qui Ludha dicitur	Triad. Thaum.	94
1647	Qui Ludha dicitur. Est oppidum Australis Ultoniae, hodie vulgo Luth priscis Ludh magh sive Lubhmagh dictum, celebri sancti Mochtei monasterio nobile; "This town is in the southern part of Ulster, now commonly called Luth, and was called by the ancients Ludh magh or Lubh magh, noble for the celebrated Monastery of S. Mocteus"	Triad. Thaum. (aistr. OSL Louth)	114 n.135
1692	/Do mhac Éamoinn is lámh leasa /lúb i séadaibh nach cuir cás /inghean an fhéil fhinn ó Lúghmhadh / fá chéibh chlaoin is úrghlan d'ás.	Ó Bruadair	iii, 190
1695	Dhíol Seon Mhac Cearnaigh car de ghabáiste nua, /Is thug Siobhán Nic Ardail cárta do dhuine le clú; /Is minic a charn Brian Bearnach cailín i gclúid; /Is iomaí fear Gallda ón tsráid sin Londain go Lú.	Séamas Dall Mac Cuarta, Dánta	72, 17
1700	Atá lile gan smúid ar m'airese i Lú /is ní cheilfidh mé a clú go dearfa, /an ghlaine is an snua bhí ag Helen ar dtús /gurab aici go nua tá ar tearma; /gan bhriseadh, gan bhrú, gan mhealladh le cluain /ach soineanta súgach leanbaí, /agus tuilte de dhúchas fhola rí Mumhan /in Ailí ghil chiúin Ní Chearbhaill.	Nua-Dhuanaire II	15, 1
1700c	Is iomdha búr i gContae Lú /nach seasann clú dá chéile, /acht dhruidfeadh a súil' go daingean dlúth /nuair a chífeadh siad chucu mo leithéide; /ní mar súd a cleachtadh domhsa /nuair bhí mé i ndúiche Chréamhainn, /acht ól gan diúltadh is biotáilte chumhra /agus seinm chiúin ar théadaibh.	Nua-Dhuanaire II	18, 17
1700c	Tá foscadh ag an Chrúb is cha minic linn siúl, /is ní itear ann plúr gan anlann; /ní sheasann tusa clú do na bodaigh sin ó Lú /is gurb é dúnadh a gcuid doirse ab fhearr leo: /nach cuimhin leat sa dún seo plumaí agus úlla /agus talta breátha úra na háite? /Seasann siad a ndúiche go fearúil le clú /is ní thugann siad cúl dá naimhde.	Pádraig Mac A Liondain, Dánta	34, 14
1730	Ludh no Oirghialladh	RIA MS 23E26 (Tipper)	338
1730	Lugh	RIA MS 23E26 (Tipper)	342
1730	Lugh no Louth	RIA MS 23E26 (Tipper)	339
1733	Marbhnaoi Shéamuis Mhic Cuarta do cumadh leis féin ar uair /a bháis i gConndae Lúgha.	Rainn agus Amhráin, É. Ó Tuathail 206	18
1733	Is fada mé 'mo luighe i Lughmhadh, (ls. Lúghadh) /'mo sgraiste brúighte - mo mhíle crádh! /Dúisighidh is cruinnigidh na seabhaic lúthmhar', /'s iomchraigidh an t-úr-mhac i gcaol na /gcnámh.	Rainn agus Amhráin, É. Ó Tuathail 206	19
1750c	Bhí mo leabhrán agam uaibh seal ar chuairt in m’aice i Lúgh; níor bhain fearthainn do nó fuacht is cha dteachaidh luach na h-ola ar gcúl.	Rainn & Amhr.	ix, 1
1750c	Aithris dod mháighistir go glic a leabhráin bhric, go raibh tú i Lúgh go dtugais damhsa sgéal o Ádhamh cia an lá do bhlas an t-ubhall	Rainn & Amhr.	xxxii, 8.12
1750c	Dá nguidfinn capull a gcuigeadh Mumhan /’s a gconntae Lughaidh a gheabhainn a díol	RIA 3B 38	138
1769	Tá an Chros faoi ghruaim 's gan cúirt Uí Néill ann, Nó taithí na huaisle gach uair chun féasta: Dís ó Lú is triúr ón Éirne, An iomad ón Mhí is ó íochtar Éireann, Ag imirt 's ag ól as cornaibh gléigeal, Is mar Ollamh Fódhla bhíodh an t-óg dá réiteach.	Art Mac Cumhaigh Dánta	125, l.205
1771	Sé Tiarna Lú nach raibh cloíte 's fuair clú na seacht dtíortha, 'S is úr-shlat den chaomh-choill sin Séamas ó fhréimh, De dhúchas na ndaoine a mbíodh dúicheacha 's tíortha Ag umhlú faoi chíos dóibh gan díomua go léir. 'S iad na Pluincéadaigh scaoilfeadh gach céim-dhochar dínne, Go fonnmhar ag éirí 's ag dreasú na n-éacht, Ach siúd planda den fhíor-fhuil tá ceansa gan aon locht, Mar Choinchulainn líofa ag bíogadh na stéad.	Art Mac Cumhaigh Dánta	127, l.17
1772	Is sochar dhúinn cuairt an chuaine dhil sa /De shíol tréan-ríthe Éireann, /Ó Iarlaibh Lú 's na dtriúcha timpeall, /Siar go Cruachan Mhéabha: /Clann Diarmada ó thuaidh, 's a ngruadha ar lasadh /Gach uair mar an gha gréine, /Is Brannaigh na gcuach thug buaidh le fortún, /Ar chuartú thart na réagún.	Art Mac Cumhaigh, Dánta	135, 11
1780c	Bhí mé lá aereach ag dul bothar a' bhuaidheartha, Is ga h-é chas damh acht spéir-bhean as Conndae /Lughmhaigh; /d'fhiafraigh mé duithe, fríd chomhrádh pléide, /An bpósfadh sí gréasaidhe as Conndae an Dúin.	Céad Cheol. Uladh	99
1800	/Beir mo chéad beann mar fhéirín go dúbalta siar uaim /Mar chónaíos an fialmhac is taitneamhach cliú; /An fíor-fhiosaigh céillí de mhianshliocht an Ghaeil Ghlais, /Fuair ansacht ón éigse agus ó gach saoi glic faoi Lú;	Mac Giolla Choille	71
1836	Lugh na cléire mar leightear a m-Bíobla	OS Namebook, Louth	3, 1.
1836	Lugh na cléire mar leightear a m-Bíobla	OS Namebook, Louth	3, 1.
1836	Louth village is called by the people in Irish Lugh and parish, paraiste Lúghmhaíghe (Loo-ee)	OSL Louth	114, 213
1836	“In the townland of Priorstate (sic leg.) (Dúithche na mBráthar) are the ruins of a religious establishment which the people call Louth Monastery (Mainistir Lúghmhaighe)”	OSL Louth	114, 214
1836	“The people do not remember any other name for the county but the county of Louth and in Irish Conda Lugh. This is the exact pronunciation and Sarsfield never heard any other name for it” [Nóta: Patrick Sarsfield, a respectable farmer and a very intelligent man living about half a mile distant from the old Monastery OSL 1].	OSL Louth	9, 14
1840	Tháinig glúineadóir as Contae Lú ann, /Is tháinig Jury ann as Ardmhach, /Tháinig trúpa as Contae Dhúin ann, /Agus seisear búisteoir as Cairlinn, /Tháinig cúigear ó Chaiseal Mumhan ann /Is as Doire Núis tháinig a lán ann; /Ba é críoch na cúise gur mhionnaigh triúr dhíobh /Gurb é an gúta thug bás dó.	Art Mac Bionnáid, Dánta	40, 17
1848	Sa gCondae Lú a sheastar cliú /Le sceallán cumhra scéamhach, /Is scinn anuas le meas is bua /Go ceart ón uaisle Ghaelach, //An staraí suairc, croí gan chruas - /Go mba fada buan a bheidh sé /I ngean gan fuath ag an tslua, /Ag míniú duar Gaeilge. /	Aodh Mac Domhnaill, Dánta	74, 30
1857	barun Lugaidh, Plunket;	Mac Bionáid, Stair	191
1857	/ /Condae Lugaidh. / /Ann san mbliaghan 1641, ansa mhidh Fhabhra, do slaod-/mharbhadh tuairim tri-cheud de dhaoine bochta eadra fear, bean /agus paiste a gcoilligh Dhoirearach le partaigh do gharastun /Thraigh-Bhaile Dhuin-Dealgna agus Dhroicheat-Ath.	Mac Bionáid, Stair	300, 9

== Official sources ==
=== 12th – 16th century ===
Official administrative sources (Church and state) 12th – 16th century.

Year	Reference	Source	Page
1139	Liueth	Chart. Mary’s	II, 258
1169	Edanus Lugwdensis episcopus	Reg. Prioratus Omnium Sanctorum	50 (CLAJ 4,135)
1171-2	Edano Lug: episcopo	Reg. Prioratus Omnium Sanctorum	20 (CLAJ 4,135)
1178	episcopus de Lugbud	CCCD	364(CLAJ 4,135)
1178	Edanus Lughbdunensis episcopus	Gesta Henrici II	(CLAJ 4,135)
1188	Cristinus dei gratia Lugdunensis episcopus	Charter Christin	178 (CLAJ 4)
1188	prior sancte marie de lugdon.	Charter Christin	178 (CLAJ 4)
1195	Loueth, sheriff of	Gorm. Reg.	144
1197	Donatus .....Lugdonenesis ecclesie dictus prior	Charter Donatus	179 (CLAJ 4)
1202-3	Luvethe	CDI	I, 28
1203	Luveth’(King’s castle of L.)	CDI	I, 31
1204	Luvenensis	CDI	I, 34
1210c	apud pratum iuxta Luvet	CLAJ	4, 12
1221	Louedhe	CDI	I, 155
1228	Louth	CDI	I, 245
1241	Luvedth’(manor of)	CDI	I, 378
1252	ecclesia Ludunensis	Pont. Hib.	II,176
1252	ecclesia Clochorensis vel Ludonensis	Pont. Hib.	II,176
1252	cuius ecclesiae Ludonensis B. Mocteus patronatus est primus	Pont. Hib.	II,176
1260	Loued, house of St. Mary of	Gorm. Reg.	155
1260	Louethd, house of St. Mary,	Gorm. Reg.	155
1295	Nicholai Prioris Domus Sanctae Mariae de Lowith	Charter (CLAJ 4)	181
1308	County Loueth	Rot. Pat. Claus	7
1309	vic’Loueth	Rot. Pat. Claus	8
1316	Dundalc in co’Luvd’	Rot. Pat. Claus	1
1318	Louth	Plea R.	Ed. II, 7
1318	apud Loueth	Rot. Pat. Claus	23
1320	Louth	Plea R.	Ed. II, 9
1336	Loueth	Rot. Pat. Claus	41
1338	Louth	Plea R.	Ed. III, 34
1342	Lowthe	Plea R.	Ed. III, 2
1344	Louthe	Plea R.	Ed. III, 2
1381	Loueth	Dowd. Deeds	109
1383	Co. Loueth	Dowd. Deeds	115(no.285)
1383	county of Louethye	Dowd. Deeds	115(no.286)
1400	Louth	Rot. Pat. Claus	158
1525	episcopi monasterium de Louaeth	Reg. Clogher (CLAJ 4)	240
1525	ecclesia Ludunensis	Reg. Clogher (CLAJ 4)	254
1540	Curate of Lowiht	Reg. Dowd.	93 (CLAJ VI, 93)
1540	Co. Louth	Ir. Mon. Poss.	16
1540	monastery of Louth	Ir. Mon. Poss.	16
1540	Town of Lowth	Ir. Mon. Poss.	229
1540	Louthe, Tenants and occupies of 24 cottages in L.	Ir. Mon. Poss.	233
1542	the late priory of Lowth	Reg. Dowd.	99
1550	Louthe, rectories and tithes of,	Fiant Edw.	568

=== 20th century ===
Official administrative sources (state) 20th century.

Year	Reference	Source	Page
1905	Lughbhadh, Seosamh Laoide	Post-Sheanchas Cuid I – Sacsbhéarla-Gaedhilg	_
1919 21 January	Co. Lughmhaighe Seán Ó Ceallaigh "I láthair"	Dáil Éireann Roll-call	Vol. F No. 1

== Controversy over County name ==
In 1964, the provisional official form 'Lú' was published in Ainmneacha Gaeilge na mBailte Poist i gCúige Laighean: Liosta sealadach. It was in 1969 that the form Lú was adopted as the official Irish form and was published as such in Ainmneacha Gaeilge na mBailte Poist.

In 1973, all of the Irish forms published in Ainmneacha Gaeilge na mBailte Poist, including the form Lú, were given legal status in An tOrdú Logainmneacha (Foirmeacha Gaeilge) (Uimhir 1, Bailte Poist) / The Placenames Order (Irish forms) (Number 1, Post-towns). In 1977 The Department of Post and Telegraphs published 'Lú' as the Irish name of Louth in Eolaí an Phoist, the Post Office Guide

In 2003 the provisions of Part 5 of Acht na dTeangacha Oifigiúla / The Official Languages Act, revoked the Placenames Act of 1973. Legal status in An tOrdú Logainmneacha (Contae Lú) / The Placenames Order (County Louth), declared the official version of the barony, parish and village of Louth to be Lú. That same year the Irish version of the name of the county, Contae Lú, was given legal status in An tOrdú Logainmneacha (Cúigí agus contaetha) / The Placenames Order (Provinces and counties).

However, Louth County Council consistently refused to accept Lú as the Irish translation. Contae Lughaí was used on signposts erected on roads entering the county, the Crest of the Council states Chontae Lughaí, and in 2007 Comhairle Chontae Lughaí (Louth County Council) was used in the IPA’s Administration Yearbook & Diary.

In 2006 Louth County Council submitted a proposal to An Príomhoifigeach Logainmneacha, to change Lú to Lughaí. During 2007 the proposal was investigated by Dónall Mac Giolla Easpaig, of An Príomhoifigeach Logainmneacha. The proposal was dismissed in December 2007, with a declaration that Lughaí was fictitious, had no historical significance, and no link to previous Irish lexical. During the Louth County Council meeting held in County Hall, Dundalk on Monday 31 March 2008, no objections to the response, and Lú has since been used as the Irish word for Louth. Minute No. 48/08 of this meeting states: "The correspondence from the Dept of Gaeltacht, Community and Rural affairs and the Placenames Commission regarding the Irish title of County Louth as discussed with members raising no objections to the Placenames Commission recommendation of Lú but requesting that advice be sought on the correct spelling of Lú in its tuiseal ginideach (genitive case) form" [sic]
