= List of songs about Louth =

This is a list of songs about County Louth, Ireland.

- "Dear Dundalk" - Written and recorded by Dundalk-born musician Des Wilson (1943–1990).
- "The Town of Dundalk" - Written by George Elliot and Michael Byron, recorded by Michael Bracken.
- "The Wee County" - Written and recorded by Annie Mc.
- "The Blackbird of Slane" - Song by T. Smith about the WW1 poet Francis Ledwidge, recorded by Seán Donnelly.
- "Football Final 1957" - By Nicholas Craven. Collected by Pat Hillen and Tom Kindlon from the singing of Jemmy Dowdall. Air: "The Mountains of Mourne"
- "Grand Old County Louth" - Written by John Nestor and Bobby O'Driscoll.
- "Victorious Roche" - Victory of Roche Emmets, 3 January 1954. Written by Jack Sands. Air: "The Soirée on Skull Hill"
- "Wren Boys Song" - A local song.
- "The Soiree at Skull Hill" - written by Willie Hynes, postman, 1912.
- "The Turfman from Ardee"
- "The Woods of County Louth" - written by Hugh McKitterick and Larry Magnier - recorded by Dermot O'Brien (1977)
- "Farewell to Carlingford"
- "The Rose of Ardee"
- "The Hurling Match at Bavan, Omeath, 1750"
- "Election Ballad of 1826"
- "Liberty's Battle" (election song)
- "Usurpation Conquered" (election song)
- "The Mountains of Cooley" - written by Eilish Boland.
- "Come sing a song for Louth" - written by Hugh McKitterick

== See also ==
- List of Irish ballads
