= St. Mochta's House =

- The Monk's House
- Teach Naomh Mochta
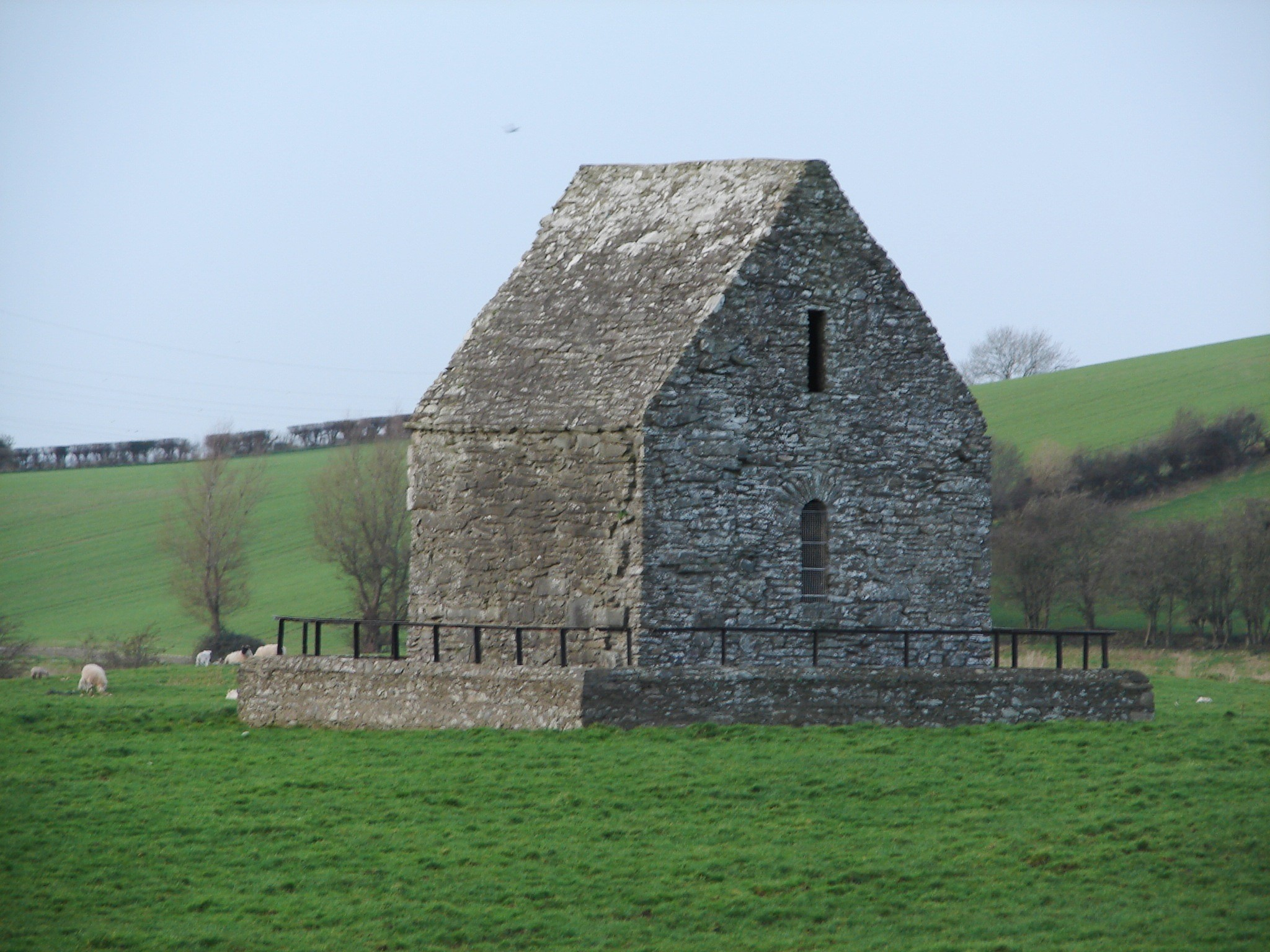

- Location within Ireland
- 53.953412°N 6.545339°W
- Location: Priorstate, Louth, County Louth
- Country: Ireland
- Denomination: Church of Ireland
- Previous denomination: Pre-Reformation Catholic

Architecture
- Functional status: inactive
- Heritage designation

National monument of Ireland
- Official name: St. Mochta's House
- Reference no.: 312
- Style: Celtic Christianity
- Years built: c. 1150–1200

Specifications
- Length: 4.88 m (16.0 ft) (internal)
- Width: 2.82 m (9 ft 3 in) (internal)
- Materials: stone

Administration
- Diocese: Armagh

St. Mochta's House is a medieval oratory and National Monument in County Louth, Ireland.

== Location ==
St. Mochta's House is located to the northwest of Louth village.

== History ==
Mochta (died AD 535 or 537) was a disciple of Saint Patrick and established a monastery at Louth village c. AD 528. There are no physical remains from the early monastery. The ruined buildings at the site today are the 13th century church of St. Mary's Priory, Louth and the oratory called St Mochta's House, which is believed to date from the second half of the twelfth century, although some sources place it earlier, in the 9th–11th centuries.

There are many stone buildings in Ireland with the names of saints' houses, such as St. Columb's House, Kells, County Meath. Most of these buildings are said to contain the grave or relics of the titular saint. In the year 1242, according to the Annals of Connacht, "The Archbishop of Armagh and the canons abbots of Ireland held a great chapter to honour the Order in Louth when some of the relics which Mochta had assembled from Rome were raised." This suggests that Mochta brought back relics of other saints from Rome, but it's also possible that his own bones were added to them.

The surrounding wall was built in 1906 by Louth County Council, and conservation work was done in 1934 by the Office of Public Works.

== Building ==
St. Mochta's House is a rectangular building with barrel-vaulted roof, and a chamber above reachable by an internal stair.
