= Mochta =

Last surviving disciple of Saint Patrick

Saint Mochta Abbot of Louth
- Born: Britain
- Residence: Louth, County Louth, Ireland
- Died: c. 535; Ireland
- Canonized: Pre-congregation
- Feast: 19 August

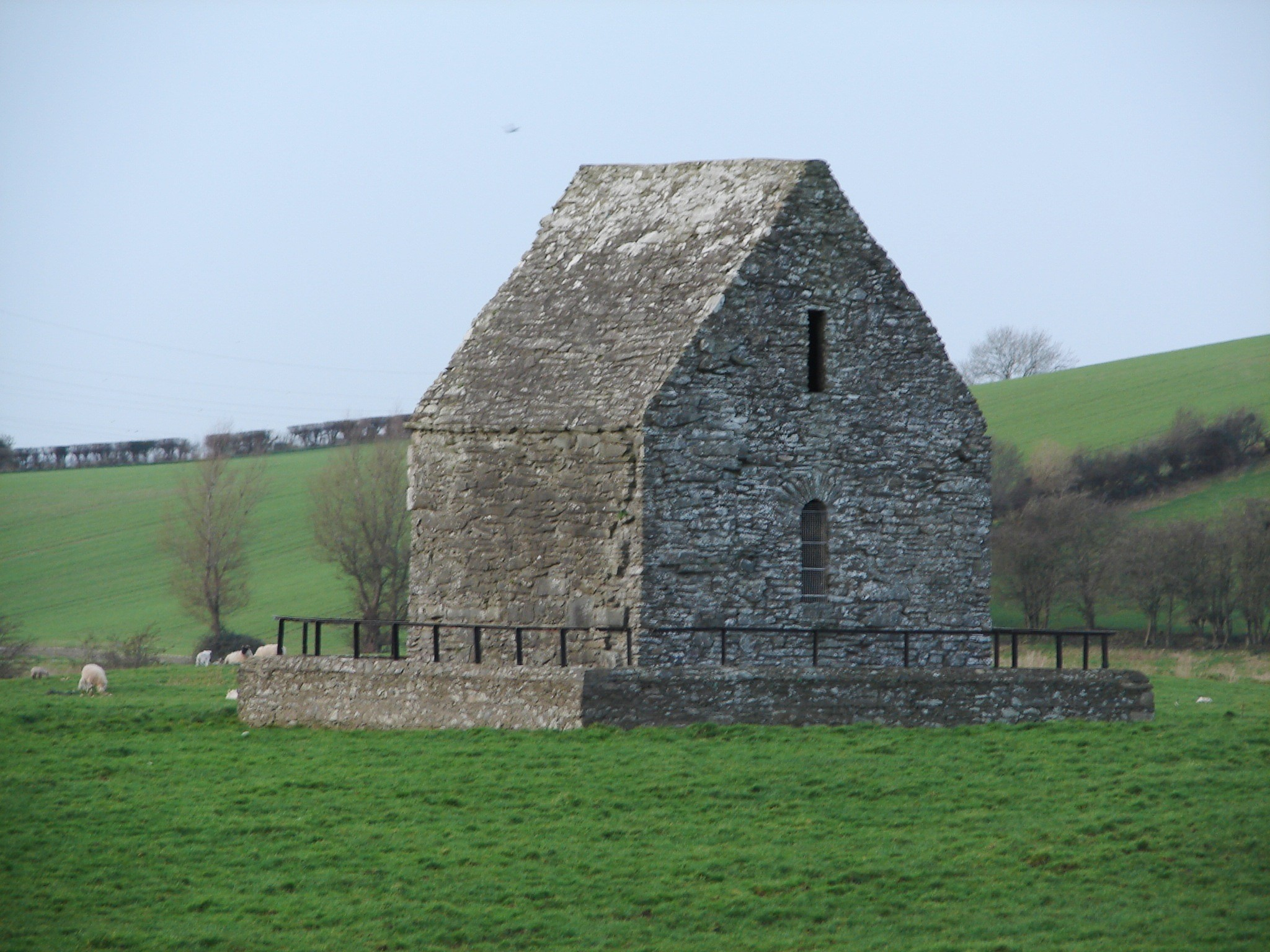
St. Mochta's House, County Louth, held Mochta's remains from the 12th century onward.

Saint Mochta (variously Mochtae, Mahew, Mochteus, Maucteus, Mauchteus; died 20 August 535, or A.D. 537), was the last surviving disciple of Saint Patrick.

== Life ==
Mochta was, like Patrick, a native of Britain. His name is British, and Adomnán's Life of Columba describes him as "a certain British stranger, a holy man and a disciple of the holy bishop Patrick". Adomnán presents Mochta as having prophesied the birth of Colm Cille.

According to one account, Mochta was brought to Ireland as a child, along with his parents, by a druid named Hoam. The druid settled in County Louth, where Mochta was brought up as a member of the family. He went to Rome to continue his studies, and there the Pope consecrated him bishop and sent him back to Ireland with twelve companions. The first church he founded was at Kilmore. Departing from Kilmore, he left all his possessions to the monks, taking only "the fountain at the door". He followed the stream, (or according to the Vita, the stream followed him) to Louth. This became the river Fane.

He is said to have founded a monastery in Louth in Ireland. Louth was originally the site of a shrine to the Celtic god Lugh. Mochta's monastery gained a nationwide reputation. Mochta was an accomplished scholar, especially learned in Sacred Scripture. He wrote a rule for monks, but no trace of it has survived. He began a series of annals at Louth, which was continued by his successors, and became known as the Book of the Monks. In his old age, Patrick came and spent some time with Mochta. After Patrick's death, Mochta took charge of Armagh for a brief period before turning it over to Benignus.

One story has him restoring to life the daughter of the druid Hoam. The young woman then became a nun who made vestments and altar-cloths.

Both monastery and village were burned and plundered frequently by the Danes in the period 829–968. A round tower, built for protection, was blown down in 981.

The Annals of Ulster report his death twice, in 535 and 537, which points to him being considerably younger than Patrick, whose death the Annals date to 493. Scholars believe that he, the last of Patrick's disciples then alive, died at the age of 90. The entry for 535 dates his death to the 13th of the Calends of September, i.e. 20 August, and quotes the opening of a letter written by him: "Mauchteus, a sinner, priest, disciple of St Patrick, sends greetings in the Lord." However neither the rest of this letter nor any other compositions of his have survived.

== See also ==
- St. Mochta's House
