= County Louth =

County in Ireland

Coordinates: 53°50′N 6°30′W

County Louth Contae Lú
- County
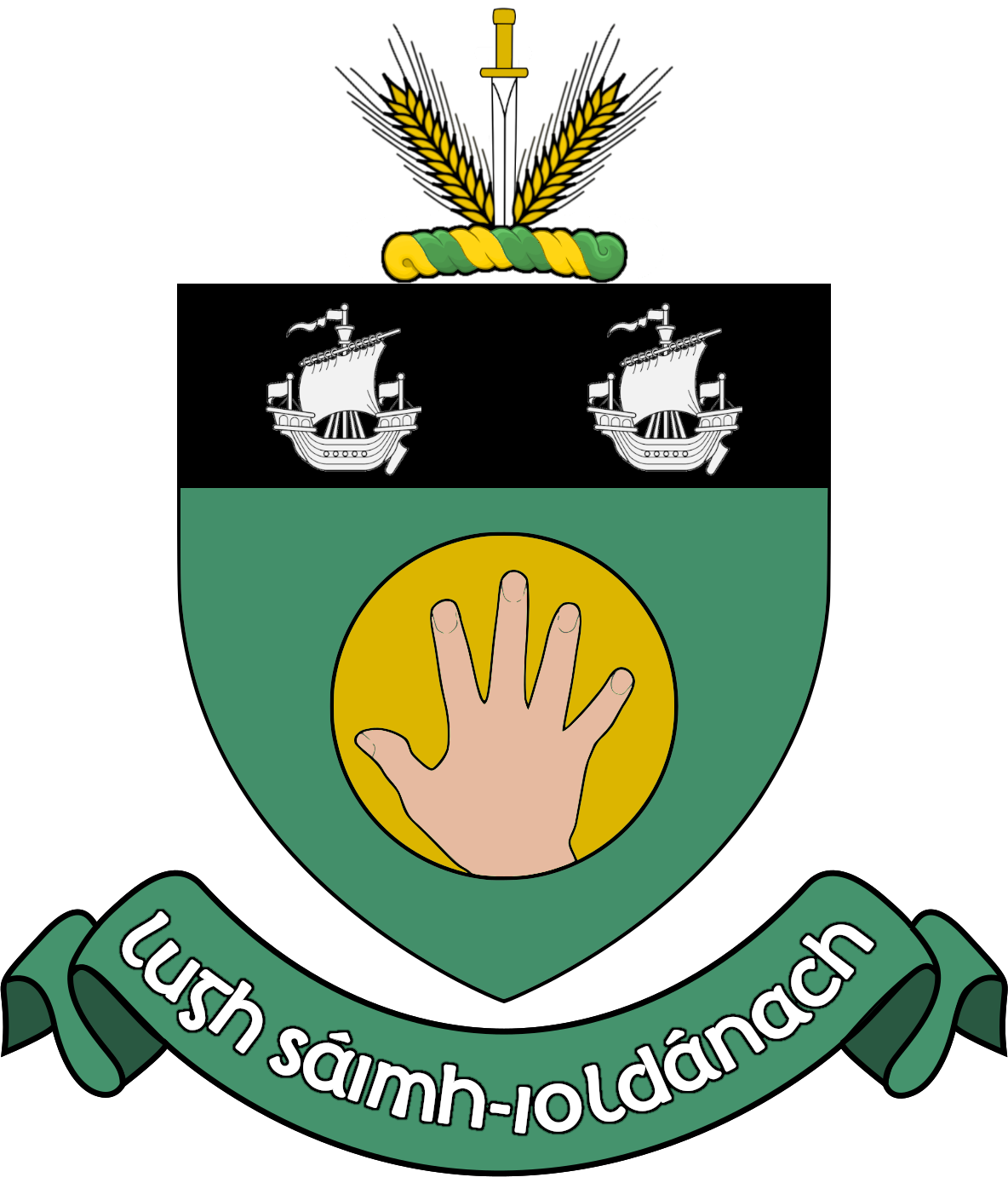
- Coat of arms
- Nickname: The Wee County
- Motto: Lugh sáimh-ioldánach (Irish) "Lugh equally skilled in many arts"
- Interactive map of County Louth
- Country: Ireland
- Province: Leinster
- Region: Eastern and Midland
- Established: 1210
- County town: Dundalk
- Largest settlement: Drogheda

Government
  - Local authority: Louth County Council
  - Dáil constituency: Louth
  - EP constituency: Midlands–North-West

Area
  - Total: 826 km^{2} (319 sq mi)
  - Rank: 32nd
- Highest elevation (Slieve Foye): 589 m (1,932 ft)

Population (2022)
  - Total: 139,100
  - Rank: 17th
  - Density: 168/km^{2} (436/sq mi)
- Time zone: UTC±0 (WET)
  - Summer (DST): UTC+1 (IST)
- Eircode routing keys: A91, A92 (primarily)
- Telephone area codes: 041, 042 (primarily)
- ISO 3166 code: IE-LH
- Vehicle index mark code: LH
- Website: Official website

County Louth (/laʊð/ LOWDH; Irish: Contae Lú) is a coastal county in the Eastern and Midland Region of Ireland, within the province of Leinster. Louth is bordered by the counties of Meath to the south, Monaghan to the west, Armagh to the north and Down to the north-east, across Carlingford Lough. It is the smallest county in Ireland by land area and the 17th most populous, with just over 139,100 residents as of 2022. The county is named after the village of Louth. Louth County Council is the local authority for the county.

== History ==
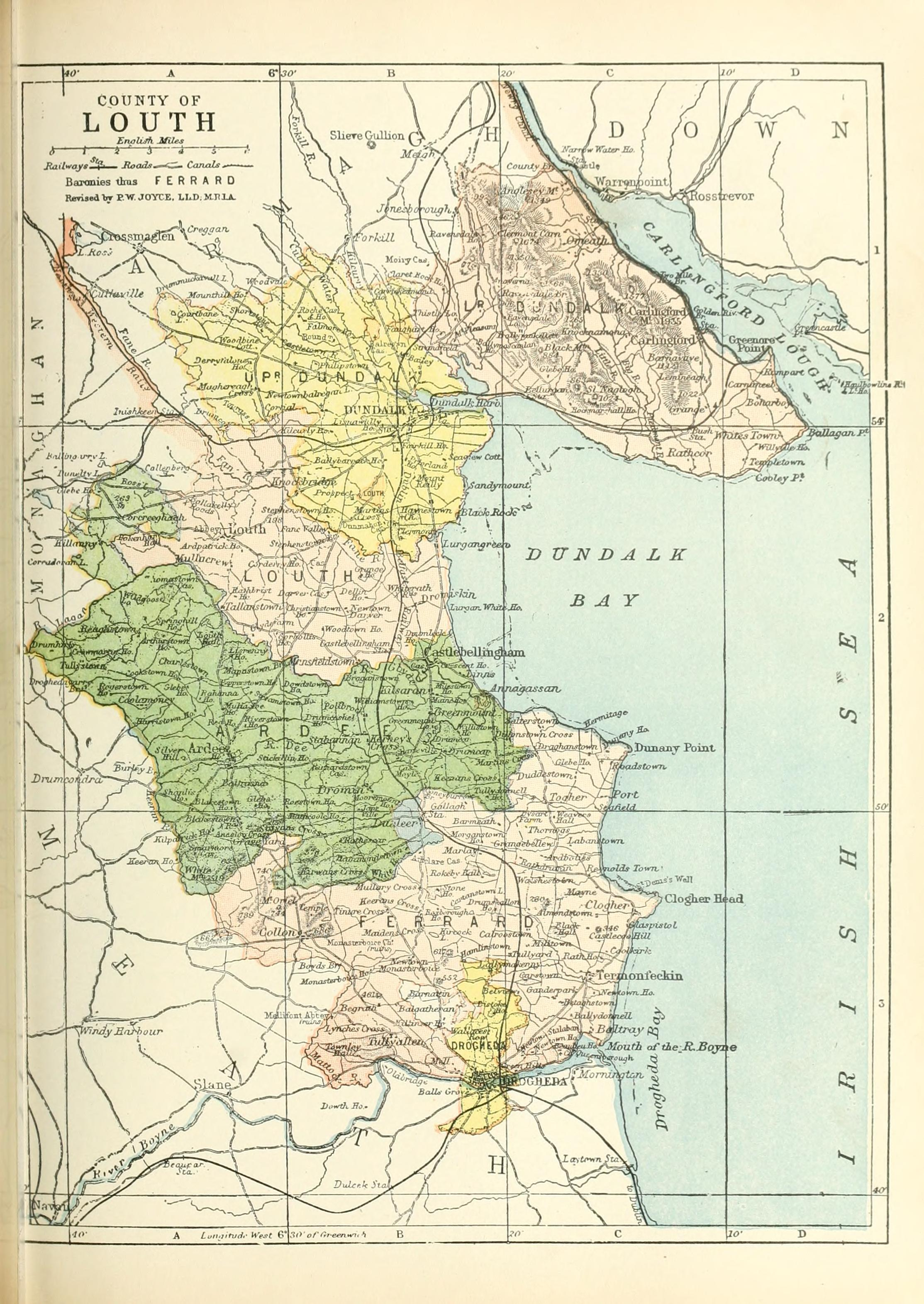
Baronies of Louth

County Louth is named after the village of Louth, which in turn is named after Lugh, a god of the ancient Irish. Historically, the placename has had various spellings; Lugmad, Lughmhaigh, and Lughmhadh (see Historic Names List, for full listing). Lú is the modern simplified spelling.

The county is steeped in myth, legend and history, and is the setting of some of the Táin Bó Cúailnge epic. Later it saw the influence of the Vikings, as seen in the name of Carlingford Lough. They also established a longphort at Annagassan in the ninth century. At this time Louth consisted of three sub-kingdoms, each subject to separate over-kingdoms: Conaille (Ulaidh); Fir Rois (Airgialla); and, the Fir Arda Ciannachta (Midhe). The whole area became part of the O'Carroll Kingdom of Airgíalla (Oriel) early in the 12th century under Donnchad Ua Cerbaill. At the same time, the area was removed from the diocese of Armagh and the episcopal see of the Diocese of Airgíalla or Clogher was transferred to Louth c. 1130–1190.

A number of historic sites are in the county, including religious sites at Monasterboice, Mellifont Abbey and the St Mary Magdalene Dominican Friary.

The Normans occupied the Louth area in the 1180s, forming the County of Oriel (Uriel or Vriell) out of the O'Carroll kingdom. At this time the western boundary of occupation was unfixed and Monaghan was still considered part of Oriel. However, over time, Louth became differentiated as 'English' Oriel, to distinguish it from the remainder ('Irish' Oriel), outside the control of the Norman colony, which had passed into the hands of the McMahon lordship of Airgíalla.

In the early 14th century Edward Bruce made claim to the High Kingship of Ireland and led an expeditionary force to Ireland. The Scottish army was repulsed from Drogheda but laid waste to much of the Anglo-Norman colony of Ireland including Ardee and Dundalk. Edward was crowned on the hill of Maledon near Dundalk on 2 May 1316. His army was finally defeated and Edward was killed in the Battle of Faughart near Dundalk, by a chiefly local force led by John de Bermingham. He was created 1st Earl of Louth and granted estates at Ardee on 12 May 1319 as a reward for his services to the Crown in defeating the Scots. De Bermingham was subsequently killed in the Braganstown massacre on 13 June 1329 along with some 200 members of his family and household, in a feud between the Anglo-Irish families of Louth.

One of the Statutes of Kilkenny in 1465 (5 Ed. IV, cap. 3) stated "That every Irishman that dwell betwixt or amongst Englishmen in the County of Dublin, Myeth, Vriell [i.e. Oriel], and Kildare ... shall take to him an English surname of one town, as Sutton, Chester, Trym, Skryne, Corke, Kinsale; or colour, as white, blacke, browne; or arte or science, as smith or carpenter; or office, as cooke, butler ...". This was an attempt to compel Irish families in the Pale, including Louth, to adopt English surnames.

In 1189, a royal charter was granted to Dundalk after a Norman nobleman named Bertram de Verdun erected a manor house at Castletown Mount. Bertram's granddaughter Roesia de Verdun later built Castle Roche in 1236. In 1412, a royal charter was granted to Drogheda which unified the towns of Drogheda-in-Meath and Drogheda-in-Uriel (Louth) as a County in its own right, styled as 'the County of the town of Drogheda'. Drogheda continued as a County Borough until the setting up of County Councils, through the enactment of the Local Government (Ireland) Act 1898, which saw all of Drogheda, including a large area south of the River Boyne, become part of an extended County Louth.

Until the late 16th century, 1596, Louth was considered part of Ulster, before becoming part of Leinster after a conference held at Faughart between the Chiefs of Ulster (Hugh O'Neill, Earl of Tyrone and Hugh Roe O'Donnell), on the Irish side, and the Ulster-born Miler Magrath, Anglican Archbishop of Cashel, and Thomas Butler, 10th Earl of Ormond on that of the English. The lands of Ballymascanlan, part of the former estates of Mellifont Abbey, were transferred from Armagh to Louth c. 1630.

The 16th and 17th centuries featured many skirmishes and battles involving Irish and English forces, as Louth was on the main route to the Gap of the North or 'the Moiry Pass', and the Ulster areas often in rebellion and as yet uncolonised. Oliver Cromwell attacked Drogheda in 1649 slaughtering the Royalist garrison and hundreds of the town's citizens. Towards the end of the same century, the armies of the warring Kings, James II and William (III) of Orange, faced off in south Louth during the build-up to the Battle of the Boyne; the battle was fought 3 km (1.9 miles) west from Drogheda. Drogheda held for James under Lord Iveagh but surrendered to William the day after the battle of the Boyne.

In 1798, the leaders of the United Irishmen included Bartholomew Teeling, John Byrne, and Patrick Byrne, all from Castletown; Anthony Marmion from Louth Town and Dundalk, Anthony McCann from Corderry; Nicholas and Thomas Markey from Barmeath, and Arthur McKeown, John Warren, and James McAllister from Cambricville. They were betrayed by informers, notably a Dr Conlan, who came from Dundalk, and an agent provocateur called Sam Turner, from Newry. Several leaders were hanged.

The Burning of Wildgoose Lodge took place on the night of 29–30 October 1816, for which 18 men were executed.

The priest and scientist Nicholas Callan (1799–1864), inventor of the first induction coil, was from Darver.

== Geography ==
Louth, colloquially known as "The Wee County", is the smallest of Ireland's 32 counties by area, at 826km^{2}. It is the 17th most populous county, making it the fourth most densely populated county on the island of Ireland. It is the smallest of Leinster's 12 counties in size and the 6th-largest by population. Louth is bordered by four counties – Meath to the south, Monaghan to the west, Armagh to the north, and Down to the northeast. It bounded to the east by the Irish Sea. Dundalk is the county town and is located approximately 80 km (50 mi) from Belfast and 85 km (53 mi) from Dublin. Louth is also the northernmost county in Leinster, and the only county in the province to share a border with Northern Ireland.

=== Climate ===
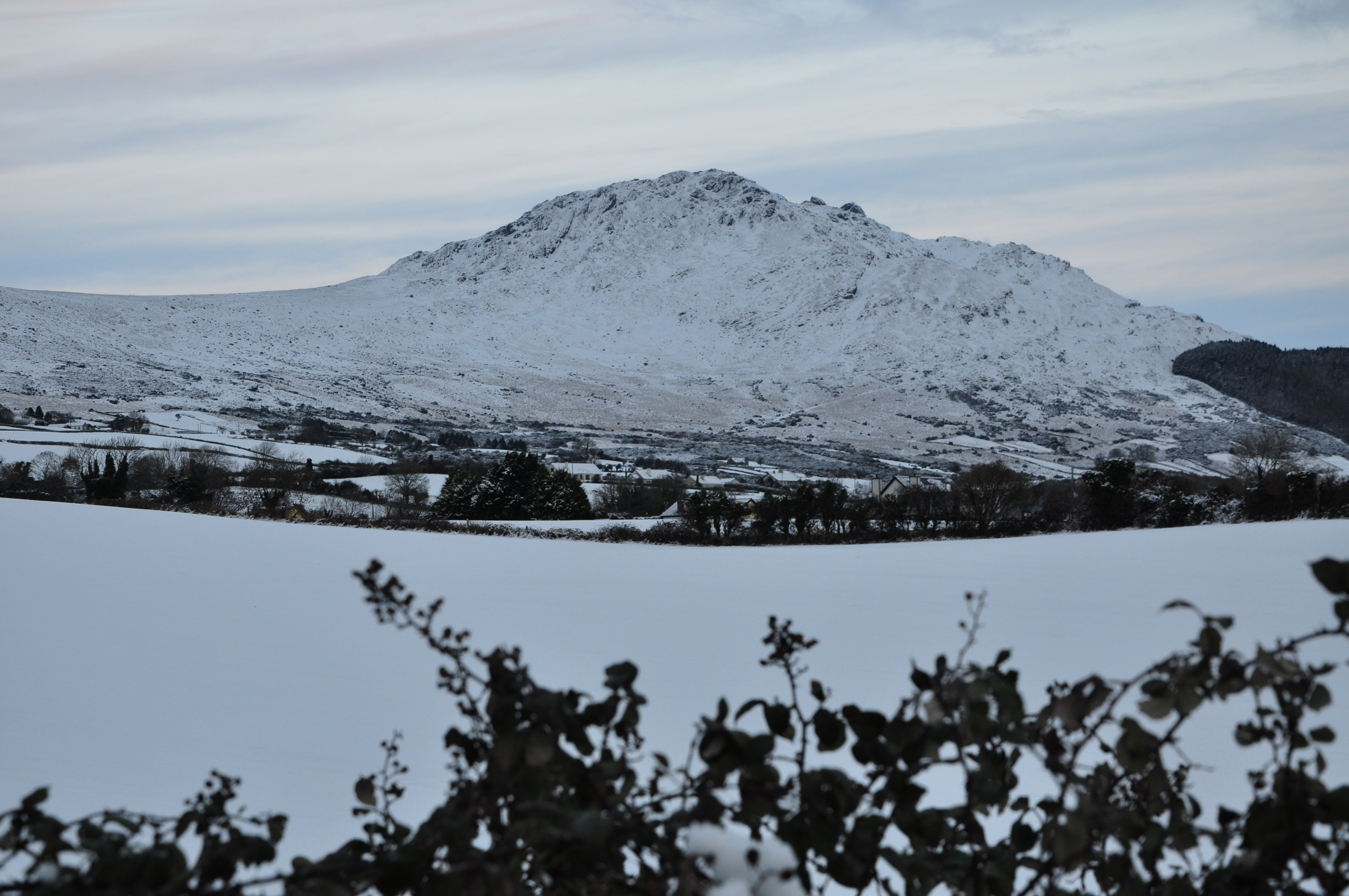
Winter snow at Slieve Foy

Louth has a temperate oceanic climate (Köppen climate classification Cfb), with cool humid summers and mild winters, strongly influenced by Atlantic ocean currents. Coastal areas generally experience milder winters and cooler, windier summers than inland areas. Daytime highs are generally in the 18–23 °C (64–73 °F) range throughout the county in July, with overnight lows in the 10–14 °C (50–57 °F) range. January and February are the coldest months, with average daily minimum temperatures typically falling below 2 °C (36 °F).

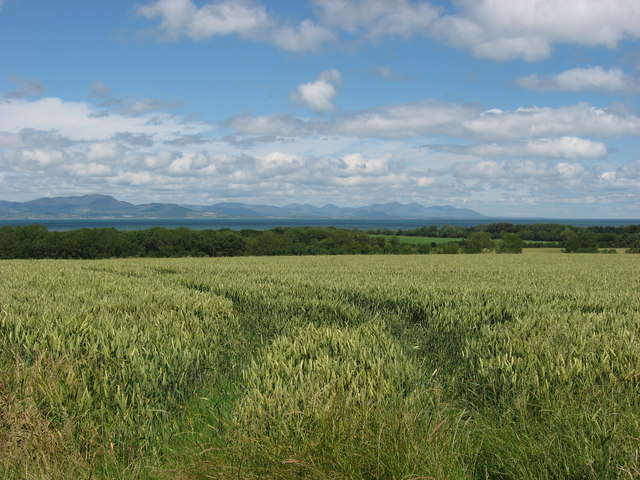
Summer meadow in Johnstown

Met Éireann records climate data for the county from their station at Boharnamoe, ca. 1 kilometre (0.62 mi) from Ardee, in the southwest of the county. The county's record high temperature is 30.9 °C (87.6 °F), set on 12 July 1983. The coldest temperature ever recorded in Louth was on 1 January 1979, when the temperature at Ardee fell to −15.2 °C (4.6 °F). Due to the moderating influence of the Irish sea, the temperature at Ardee has only surpassed 30 °C (86 °F) once since records began in 1968. Prolonged or heavy snow is rare, but most of the county will typically experience snowfall on a few days per year.

Precipitation is evenly distributed year-round, with only about 30 mm (1.2 in) of rainfall separating the wettest months (October and November) from the driest months (March and April). There are a number of synoptic weather stations which solely record rainfall located throughout the county. The driest areas are located along the coast, with average annual rainfall at Clogherhead being 735 mm (28.9 in), making it one of the driest locations on the island of Ireland. The wettest areas of the county are located around the Cooley Mountains, with the stations at Omeath (1,118 mm (44.0 in)) and Glenmore (1,203 mm (47.4 in)) recording the most rainfall in the county.

The coastal areas of the county are particularly vulnerable to flooding and storm surges during the Winter months, and significant flood defences have been constructed along Dundalk Bay. Louth County Council's Climate Change Adaptation Strategy identified coastal and riverine flooding as the primary environmental risks to the county.

Climate data for Ardee (1989–2019, extremes 1968–present), 31 mAOD
Month	Jan	Feb	Mar	Apr	May	Jun	Jul	Aug	Sep	Oct	Nov	Dec	Year
Record high °C (°F)	14.7 (58.5)	16.7 (62.1)	21.5 (70.7)	22.1 (71.8)	27.2 (81.0)	29.4 (84.9)	30.9 (87.6)	29.5 (85.1)	27.1 (80.8)	20.7 (69.3)	17.6 (63.7)	16.1 (61.0)	30.9 (87.6)
Mean daily maximum °C (°F)	8.3 (46.9)	8.9 (48.0)	10.7 (51.3)	13.3 (55.9)	16.1 (61.0)	19.0 (66.2)	20.6 (69.1)	20.2 (68.4)	18.1 (64.6)	14.5 (58.1)	10.9 (51.6)	8.6 (47.5)	14.1 (57.4)
Mean daily minimum °C (°F)	1.9 (35.4)	1.7 (35.1)	2.5 (36.5)	4.2 (39.6)	6.6 (43.9)	9.6 (49.3)	11.4 (52.5)	11.0 (51.8)	9.2 (48.6)	6.2 (43.2)	3.7 (38.7)	2.0 (35.6)	5.8 (42.5)
Record low °C (°F)	−15.2 (4.6)	−11.1 (12.0)	−8.4 (16.9)	−5.4 (22.3)	−3.2 (26.2)	−1.5 (29.3)	1.0 (33.8)	−1.1 (30.0)	−3.5 (25.7)	−5.5 (22.1)	−8.2 (17.2)	−11.8 (10.8)	−15.2 (4.6)
Average precipitation mm (inches)	74.0 (2.91)	57.8 (2.28)	54.1 (2.13)	53.8 (2.12)	61.5 (2.42)	66.2 (2.61)	67.0 (2.64)	70.3 (2.77)	63.3 (2.49)	84.4 (3.32)	86.7 (3.41)	76.1 (3.00)	815.2 (32.1)
Average precipitation days (≥ 1.0 mm)	16	12	12	11	12	11	12	11	11	13	14	14	149
Source: Met Éireann

== Demographics ==
=== Population ===
Historical population
Year	Pop.	±%
1821	119,129	—
1831	124,846	+4.8%
1841	128,240	+2.7%
1851	107,662	−16.0%
1861	90,713	−15.7%
1871	84,021	−7.4%
1881	77,684	−7.5%
1891	71,038	−8.6%
1901	65,820	−7.3%
1911	63,665	−3.3%
1926	62,739	−1.5%
1936	64,339	+2.6%
1946	66,194	+2.9%
1951	68,771	+3.9%
1956	69,194	+0.6%
1961	67,378	−2.6%
1966	69,519	+3.2%
1971	74,951	+7.8%
1979	86,135	+14.9%
1981	88,514	+2.8%
1986	91,810	+3.7%
1991	90,724	−1.2%
1996	92,166	+1.6%
2002	101,821	+10.5%
2006	111,267	+9.3%
2011	122,897	+10.5%
2016	128,884	+4.9%
2022	139,100	+7.9%

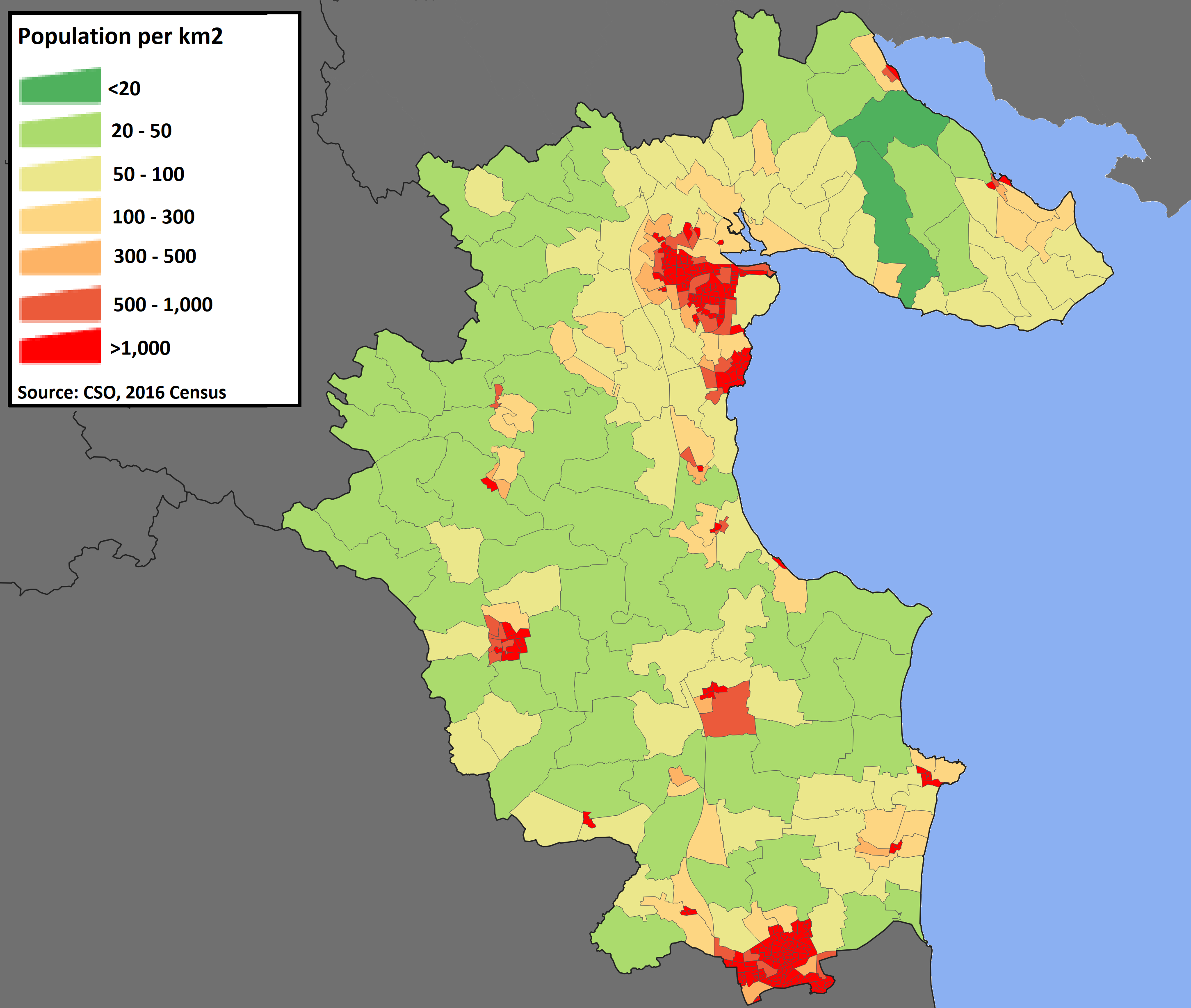
Louth population density map (2016)

According to the Central Statistics Office, 139,703 people lived in County Louth as of the 2022 census, a 7.9% increase since the 2016 census. The population density of the county is 169.1 people per square kilometre, more than double the national average, which makes Louth the second most densely populated county in the Republic of Ireland, and the fourth most densely populated county on the island of Ireland. As of 2022, Louth was also the second most urbanised county in the State, with 69.7% of the county's population living within urban areas. Under Central Statistics Office (CSO) classification, an "urban area" is a town with a population greater than 1,500. As a result, much of the county outside of the larger towns is relatively sparsely populated, with most small areas (SAs) having a population density of between 20 and 50 people per km^{2}.

The county has two dominant population centres, Dundalk, located in the north of the county, and Drogheda, located in the south on the border with County Meath. These two towns combined comprise approximately 58.9% of the county's total population, and are the 6th- and 7th-largest urban areas in Ireland respectively. Overall, Drogheda is the larger of the two.

2022 population by LEA
LEA	Population
Ardee	27,034
Drogheda Rural	19,845
Drogheda Rural	28,537
Dundalk–Carlingford	26,092
Dundalk South	38,195

Louth has experienced a rapid rate of population growth since the 1960s, nearly doubling in size in the fifty years between the census of 1966 and that of 2016. Its rate of growth (7.9%) since the 2016 census ranks 13th of 26 counties. The sizeable population growth in the county is influenced by its location along the Dublin–Belfast corridor; with the completion of the M1 motorway in particular driving the growth of Drogheda as a commuter town of Dublin. However, the northern areas of the county along the border with Northern Ireland have experienced a slight decline since 2011.

In 2016, Louth surpassed its pre-famine (1841 Census) population, becoming one of only five counties in the State to do so. As of the 2022 census, 5.9 per cent of the county's population was reported as younger than 5 years old, 28.1 per cent were between 5 and 25, 51.8 per cent were between 25 and 65, and 14.2 per cent of the population was older than 65. Of this latter group, 4,591 people (3.3 per cent) were over the age of 80. The population was evenly split between females (50.68 per cent) and males (49.32 per cent).

In 2021, there were 1,677 births within the county, and the average age of a first time mother was 30.5.

=== Urban areas ===
The most populous towns in Louth as of the 2022 census were (population in parentheses):

The most populous towns in Louth (2022)
Drogheda (44,135) (Note: Approximately 5,000 Drogheda residents are located within the boundaries of County Meath)	Dundalk (43,112)	Ardee (5,478)	Clogherhead (2,275)	Dunleer (2,143)	Termonfeckin (1,983)	Tullyallen (1,697)	Carlingford (1,528)
Dromiskin (1,292)	Castlebellingham (1,232)	Collon (864)	Omeath (778)	Knockbridge (759)	Louth (717)	Tallanstown (668)	Tinure (530)

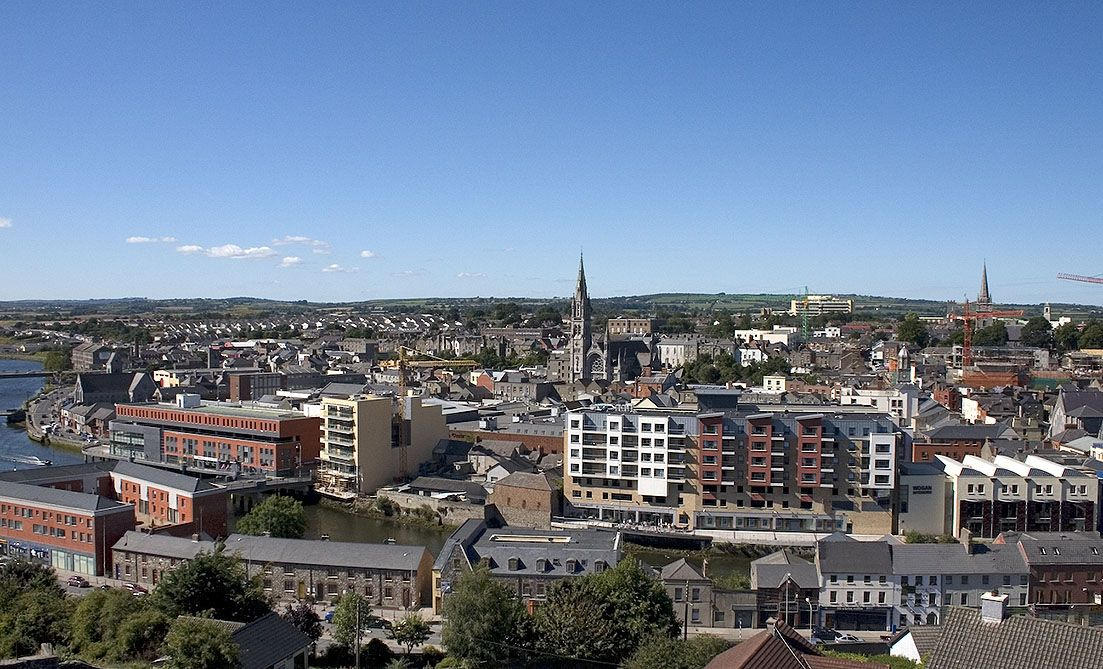
Drogheda

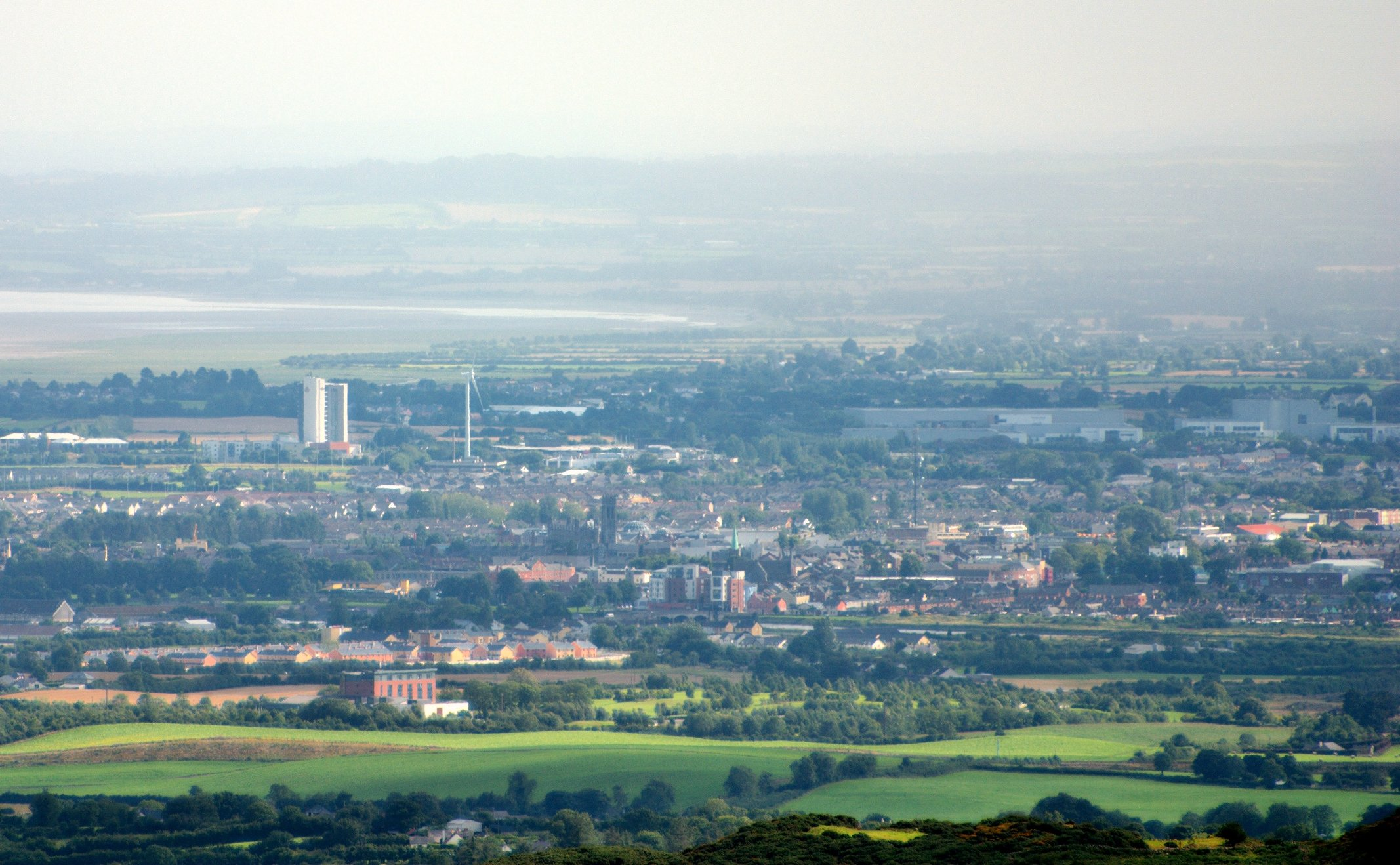
Dundalk

=== Ethnicity and migration ===
As of the 2022 census, the population of County Louth was 85.9% white. Those who identified as White Irish constituted 76.7% of the county's population, and Irish Travellers comprised a further 0.7%. Other white people who did not consider themselves ethnically Irish accounted for 8.5% of the population.

The second largest ethnic group in Louth in 2022 was black, accounting for 3.3% of the population. Of this group, virtually the entire population lived in the two largest towns, with 56.5% of Louth's black residents living in Dundalk and 36.2% living in Drogheda.

Those of Asian and Mixed Race backgrounds accounted for 2.7% (3,808 people) and 1.7% (2,333 people) of the population respectively, with the majority of these groups residing in either Drogheda or Dundalk. Around 9,000 people or 6.4% of the population did not state their ethnicity in 2022, a significant increase from 2.5% in the 2016 census.

Louth ethnic composition of population
Racial Composition	2022 Census	Percentage	2016 Census	Percentage
White	119,101	85.9%	116,813	91.5%
Black	4,547	3.3%	3,567	2.8%
Asian	3,808	2.7%	2,399	1.9%
Others including mixed	2,333	1.7%	1,756	1.4%
Not stated	8,918	6.4%	3,176	2.5%

In contrast to the other counties in the Mid-East Region, which are characterised by widespread migration from the Dublin area, Louth has one of the highest proportions of native residents in Ireland. Around two-thirds (64.5%) of Louth's residents were born within the county, making it the 7th most indigenous county in the State. People from elsewhere in the Republic of Ireland accounted for just 13.9% of Louth's population in 2022, compared with 49.2% in neighbouring County Meath to the south. A total of 30,145 people (21.7%) were born outside of the country, up from 24,509 people (19.2%) in 2016.

The largest foreign national groups by citizenship in Louth are: British (1.69%), Polish (1.50 percent), Lithuanian (1.40 percent), Nigerian (0.97 percent), Latvian (0.89 percent) and Romanian (0.57 percent).

=== Irish language ===
The Cooley Peninsula was the last Gaeltacht outpost in Leinster. Speakers of Irish existed around Omeath and into southern Armagh up until the middle of the 20th century. The area had its own local dialect, songs, poetry and traditional customs. The dialect, known as Gaeilge Oriel, is now extinct, as the last native speaker, Anne O'Hanlon, died in 1960 at the age of 89. However, extensive recordings of the dialect were made by German linguist Wilhelm Doegen for the Royal Irish Academy in 1928. An Irish language college, Coláiste Bhríde, was originally established in Omeath in 1912, but later moved to Ranafast, County Donegal. In 2012, Coláiste Bhríde celebrated its 100th anniversary in Omeath, and locals were taught phrases in Gaeilge Oriel.

Uniquely, the Cooley Peninsula had a sizable population of Presbyterian Gaeilgeoirí in the late 18th and 19th centuries, owing to its proximity to Ulster. In 1808, Reverend William Neilson published "An introduction to the Irish language" to distribute to Presbyterian ministers in the area, as many in their congregations could not speak English.

Despite its historic Gaeltacht, Louth has the lowest percentage of Irish speakers of any county in the State. Just 31.8% of the population stated that they could speak any level of Irish in the 2022 census.

=== Religion ===
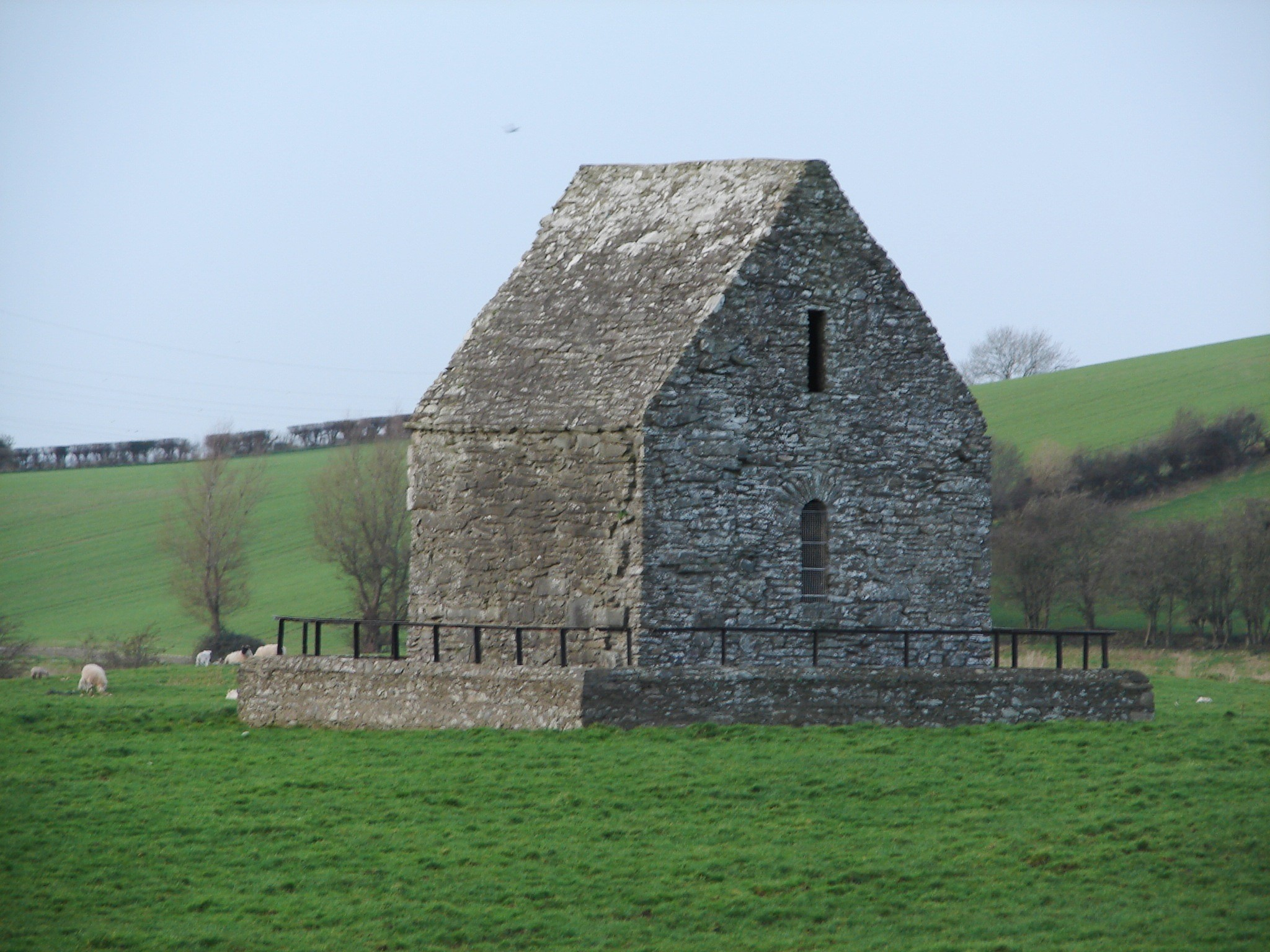
St. Mochta's House, a 1,000-year-old oratory in the village of Louth

Religion in Louth (2022)
religion	percent
Catholic	72.1%
No religion	11.9%
Other Christian	6.4%
Islam	1.6%
Other faith	0.9%
Not Stated	6.9%

According to the Central Statistics Office (CSO), the Catholic Church is by far the largest religious institution in County Louth, with 100,077 members. Orthodox Christianity was the second largest religious denomination, with 2,598 adherents. This was followed by Islam in third, with 2,281 adherents, and Anglican denominations including the Church of Ireland, England and Episcopalian in fourth, with 2,195.

The county is located within the archdiocese of Armagh in the Roman Catholic Church, and the Archbishop of Armagh has been recognised by the Vatican as the "Primate of All Ireland" since 1353. This was replicated in the Church of Ireland following the Reformation, and the Protestant Diocese of Armagh covers the same territorial extent as the Catholic diocese. Further, the Archbishop of Armagh also has the title of Primate of All Ireland within the Church of Ireland.

As was the case in much of Ireland, there was a significant increase in the number of people stating that they were either non-religious or atheist in the 2022 Census. This demographic has increased by 202% in a little over a decade (2011 to 2022), from 5,485 to 16,556. People with no religion now account for 11.9% of the county's population, up from 8% in 2016.

The fastest growing religions in the county between 2016 and 2022 were Hinduism (107%), Orthodox Christianity (80%) and Pantheism (78%), while the most rapidly declining religions were Lutheran (−23%), Evangelicalism (−19%), Buddhism (−13%) and Apostolic or Pentecostal (−11%). Although Catholicism only recorded a 4.3% decrease, the share of County Louth's residents who identified as Catholic fell sharply from 81.8% in 2016 to 72.1% in 2022.

== Local government and politics ==
The island of Ireland, showing location of County Louth.

=== Louth County Council ===
The local authority is Louth County Council, which has its offices in Dundalk, and provides a number of services including planning, roads maintenance, fire brigade, council housing, water supply, waste collection, recycling and landfill, higher education grants and funding for arts and culture.

As of the 2019 local election, Louth has been divided into five local electoral areas, whose councillors sit in three municipal districts: Ardee (which is also a municipal district), Drogheda Rural and Drogheda Rural (which form the borough district of Drogheda), and Dundalk—Carlingford and Dundalk South (which form the municipal district of Dundalk).

=== Freedom of the county ===
The following people have received the freedom of County Louth.

- Joe Biden: 25 June 2016.

=== Louth Dáil constituency ===
For elections to Dáil Éireann, Louth is represented by the five-seat Dáil constituency of Louth which takes all in the county of Louth, and in County Meath, the electoral divisions of Julianstown and part of St. Mary's.

The Report on Dáil and European Parliament Constituencies 2007 outlined:

by extending the constituency southwards from, and in the environs of, Drogheda and taking in electoral divisions which have extensive linkages with the town. This will allow the inclusion of the town of Drogheda and hinterland areas in a single constituency.

This brought the areas of the Greater Drogheda area in County Meath and their combined population of 20,375 into a single constituency.

At the 2024 general election, the constituency elected two Sinn Féin TDs (nationalist and left-wing), one Labour Party TD (centre-left), one Fine Gael TD (centre-right), and a Fianna Fáil TD (centre-right).

== Places of interest ==
- Carlingford Lough
- Cooley Peninsula
- County Museum Dundalk
- King John's Castle (Carlingford)
- Linn Duachaill
- Magdalene Tower, Drogheda
- Mellifont Abbey
- Millmount Fort
- Monasterboice
- St. Laurence's Gate
- St. Peter's Roman Catholic Church, Drogheda, where the head of St. Oliver Plunkett is housed.

== People ==
=== Entertainment ===
- Pierce Brosnan – Actor, James Bond
- Eamonn Campbell – Member of The Dubliners
- Andrea Corr – Singer, The Corrs
- Caroline Corr – Musician, The Corrs
- Jim Corr – Musician, The Corrs
- Sharon Corr – Musician, The Corrs
- Evanna Lynch – Actress, Harry Potter
- Cathy Maguire – Singer/songwriter
- John Moore – Film director
- Pádraigín Ní Uallacháin, traditional Irish singer and academic.
- Gerry O'Connor – Traditional Irish fiddle player
- Colin O'Donoghue – Actor, Once Upon a Time
- Emily Taaffe – Actor
- Aislinn Clarke – Film writer and director

=== Military ===
- James Samuel Emerson (1895–1917), British soldier and posthumous Irish recipient of the Victoria Cross,
- Patrick Anthony Langan-Byrne, British pilot, who was an Irish flying ace of the First World War credited with Ten aerial victories.
- Admiral Francis Leopold McClintock KCB FRS – British Royal Navy officer and Explorer
- George Martin Lees (1898–1955), British soldier, geologist and leading authority on the geology of the Middle East.
- Major-General Arthur Thomas Moore VC – British Soldier and Irish recipient of the Victoria Cross.
- Albert Cashier (otherwise Jennie Irene Hodgers), was born in Clogherhead and was a soldier in the Union Army during the American Civil War
- Lisa Smith (soldier), a former Irish soldier who converted to Islam and later travelled to Syria during the Syrian Civil War to join Islamic State of Iraq and the Levant (ISIS).
- Anthony Coningham Sterling (1805–1871), British Army officer and historian, author of The Highland Brigade in the Crimea.
- James Sheridan (Medal of Honor), Quartermaster United States during the American Civil War – Sailor and recipient of the Medal of Honor for action at Battle of Mobile Bay
- Hans Moore (1834–89), British Army Major who received the Victoria Cross during the Cape Frontier Wars
- William Kenny (1880–1936), British Soldier and Irish recipient of the Victoria Cross
- John Barrett Captain of HMS Minotaur (1793) and HMS Africa (1781)

=== Politics ===
- Dermot Ahern – Politician, Fianna Fáil TD for Louth
- Paddy O'Hanlon – Former Nationalist MP for South Armagh
- James Carroll – Politician, Fianna Fáil, member of Seanad Éireann from Louth
- Éamonn Ceannt, Irish republican known for his role in the Easter Rising of 1916. Born Galway, raised and educated in Louth.
- Mark Dearey – Politician, Green Party Senator from Louth
- Damien English – Politician, of Fine Gael who has served as Minister of State from 2014 to 2023.
- John Foster, 1st Baron Oriel (1740–1828), last Speaker of the Irish House of Commons.
- Séamus Kirk – Politician, Fianna Fáil TD for Louth
- Tony Martin, Canadian social democratic legislator.
- John McClintock (1770–1855), MP for Athlone 1820, for County Louth 1830–31
- Brendan McGahon – Politician, Fine Gael TD for Louth
- John McGahon, Fine Gael Senator
- Michael McKevitt – Republican dissident leader
- Arthur Morgan – Politician, Sinn Féin TD for Louth
- T.K. Whitaker (Irish Economist)
- William Hughes, Irish-born US senator from New Jersey.
- John Atkinson, Judge and Politician, MP for Londonderry North

=== Sport ===
- Thomas Byrne – Former racing driver
- Nick Colgan – Footballer
- Kenny Finn – Irish American soccer and Gaelic football player
- Beatrice Hill-Lowe – Archer
- Gary Kelly – Footballer, Leeds United
- Robert Kearney – Irish Rugby player
- Colin Larkin – footballer, Hartlepool United
- Tommy Smyth – Football commentator for ESPN
- Steve Staunton – Footballer
- Kevin Thornton – Footballer
- Ian Harte – Footballer
- Kate O’Connor – Heptathlete

=== Misc ===
- Fr Nicholas Joseph Callan, priest and scientist best known for his work on the induction coil.
- George Drumgoole Coleman – Civil architect
- Dorothy Macardle, historian.
- Matthew O'Neill, 1st Baron Dungannon, alias Matthew Kelly, (1520–1558), born in Dundalk. Father of Hugh O'Neill, Earl of Tyrone.
- Katherine Plunket, (1820–1932), was an Irish aristocrat from Ballymascanlan, County Louth, a prolific botanical illustrator and formerly the oldest person ever to be born and die in Ireland, at 111 years and 327 days.
- Nano Reid, artist.
- Peter Rice – Structural engineer.
- Alexander Williams, artist. Born in Monaghan, raised and educated in Louth.

== Gallery ==
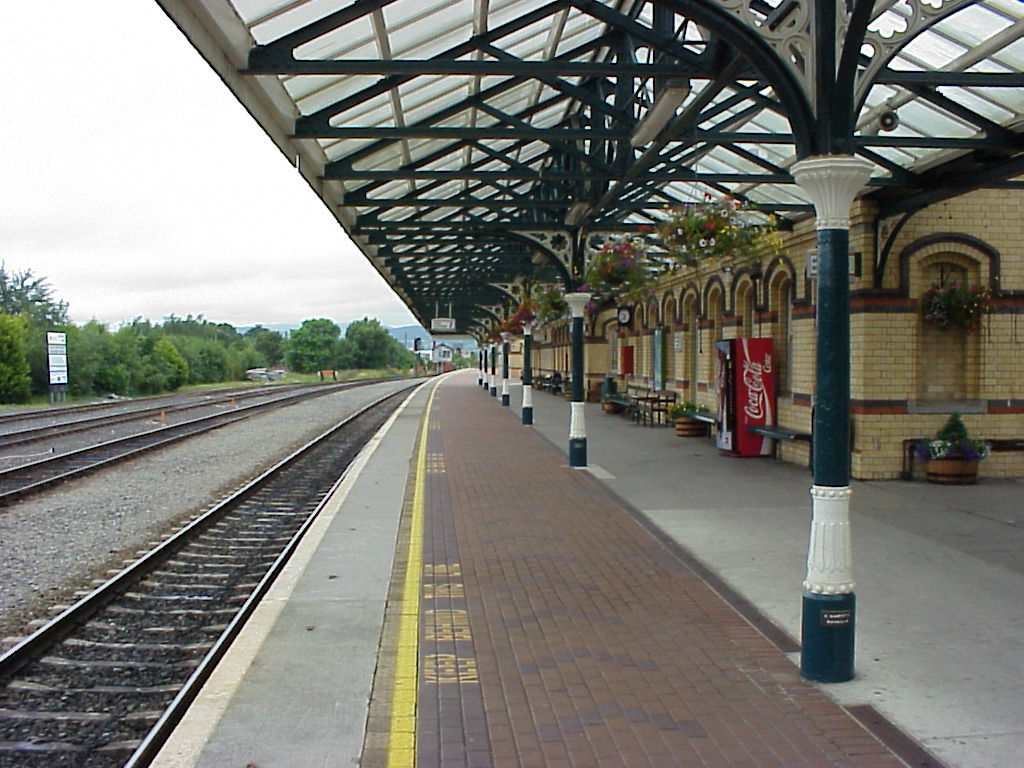
Dundalk railway station

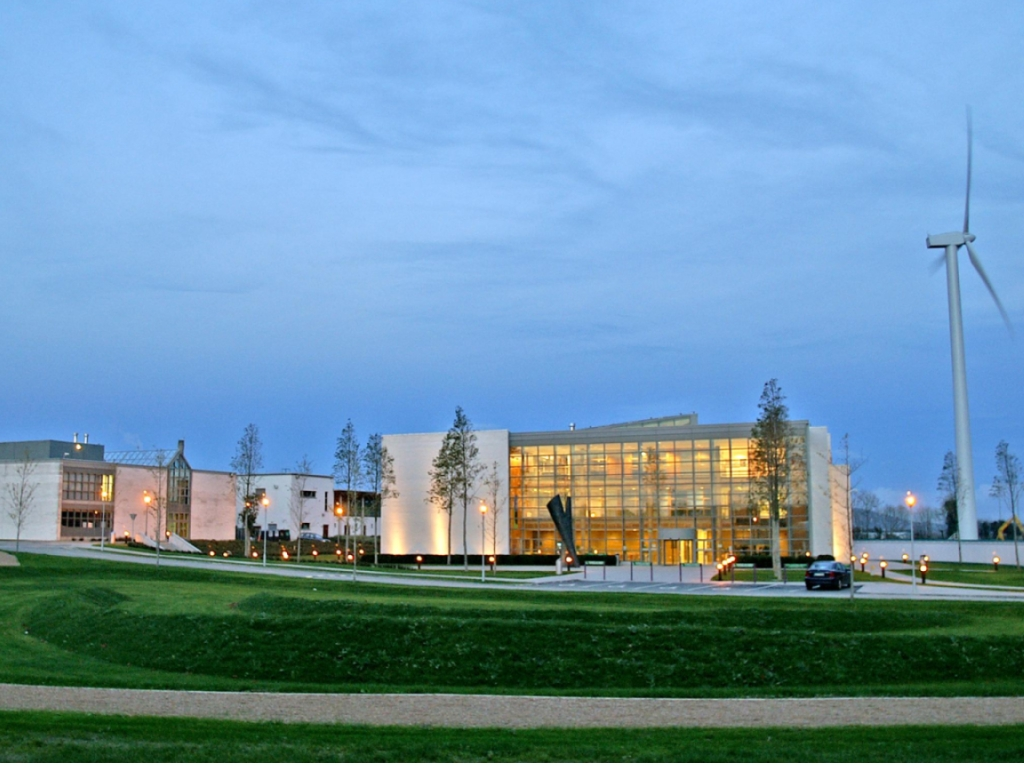
Dundalk IT.

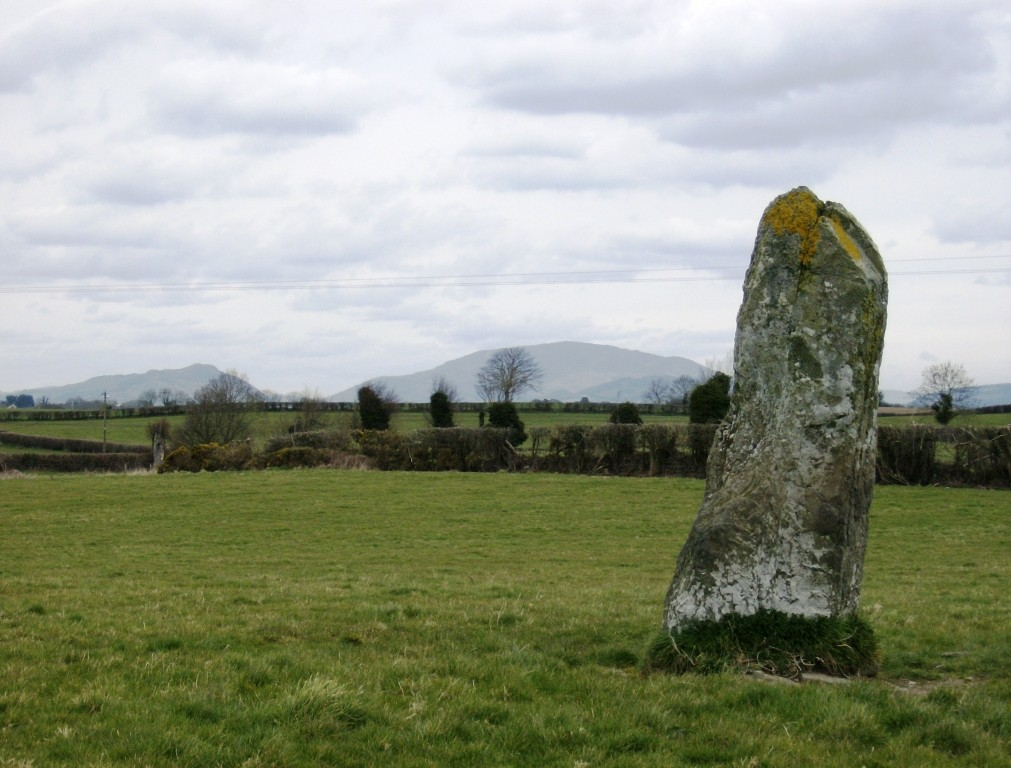
Cú Chulainn's stone

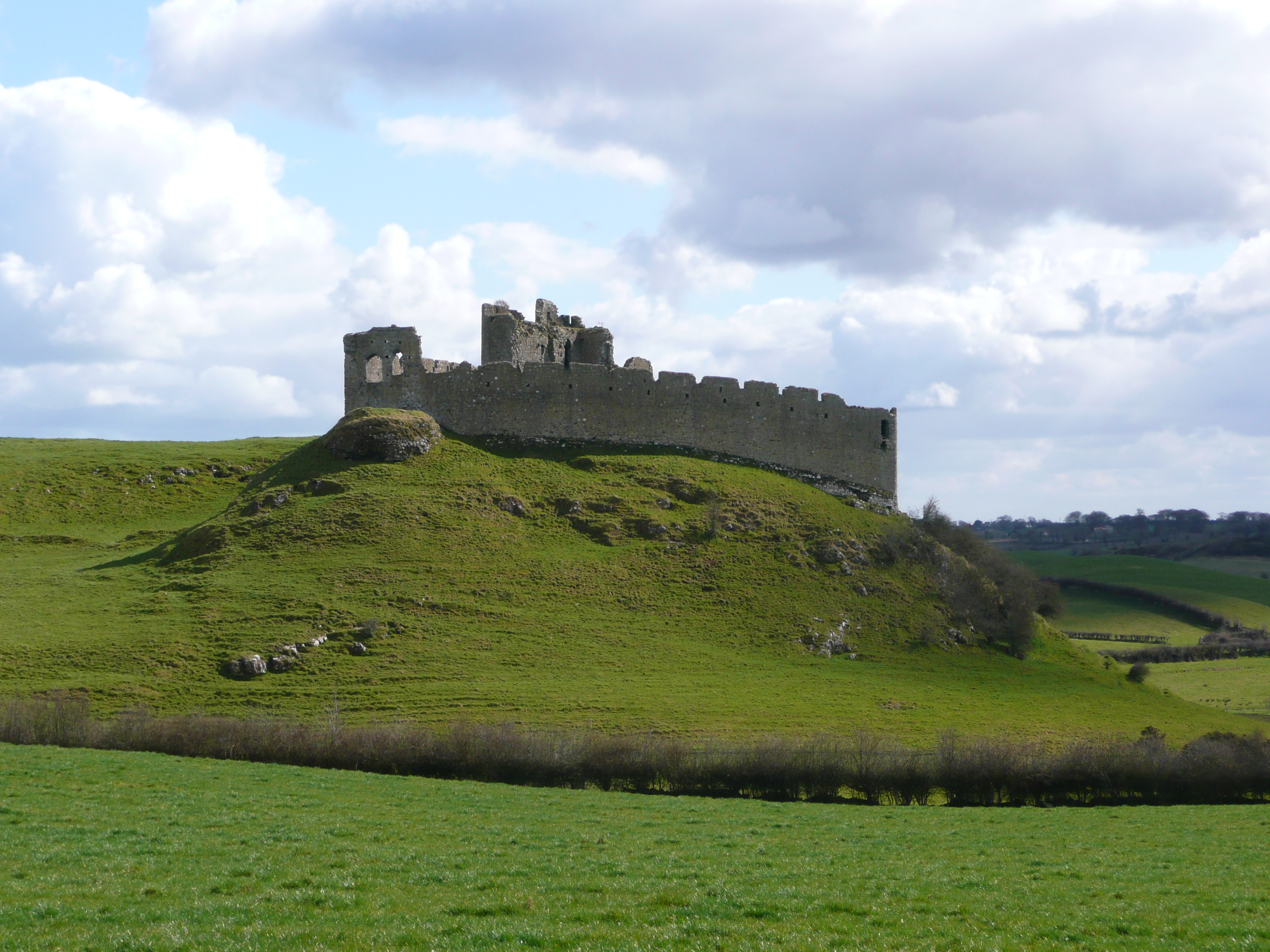
Castle Roche

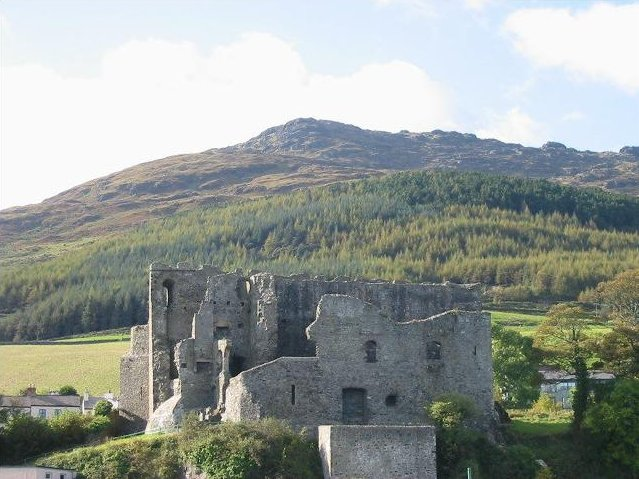
Slive Foy and King John's Castle

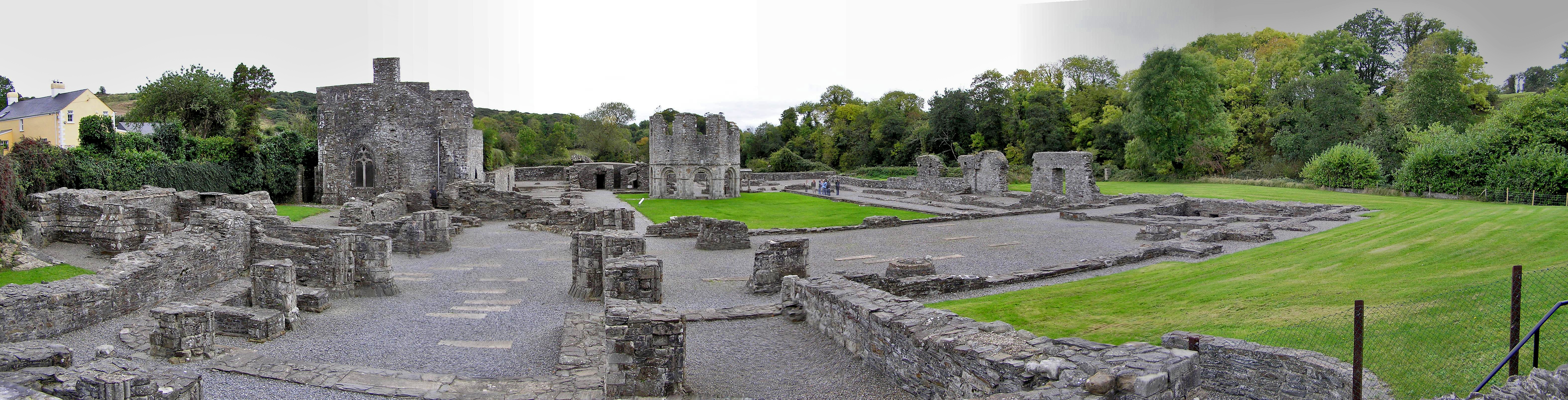
Mellifont Abbey

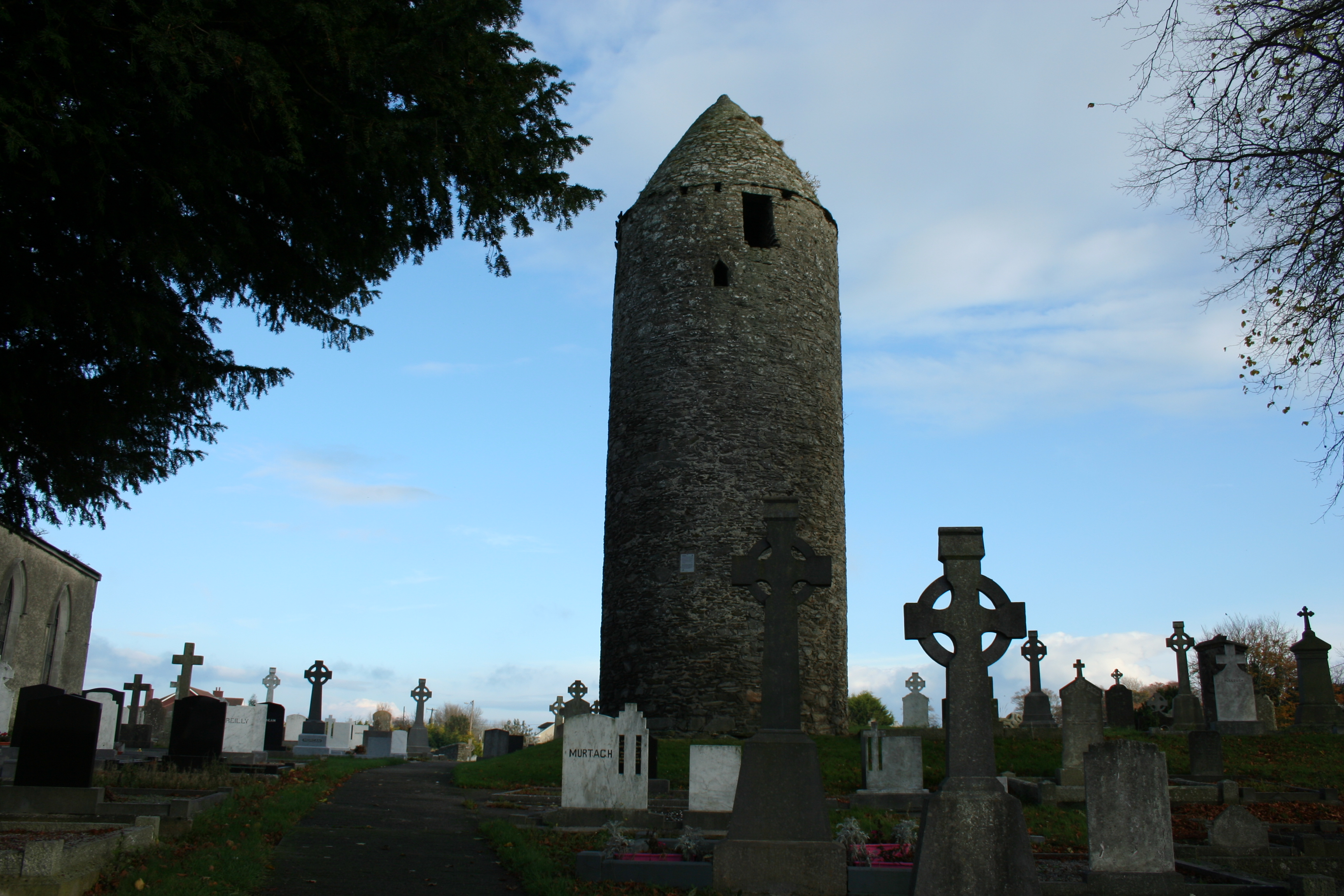
Dromiskin Round Tower

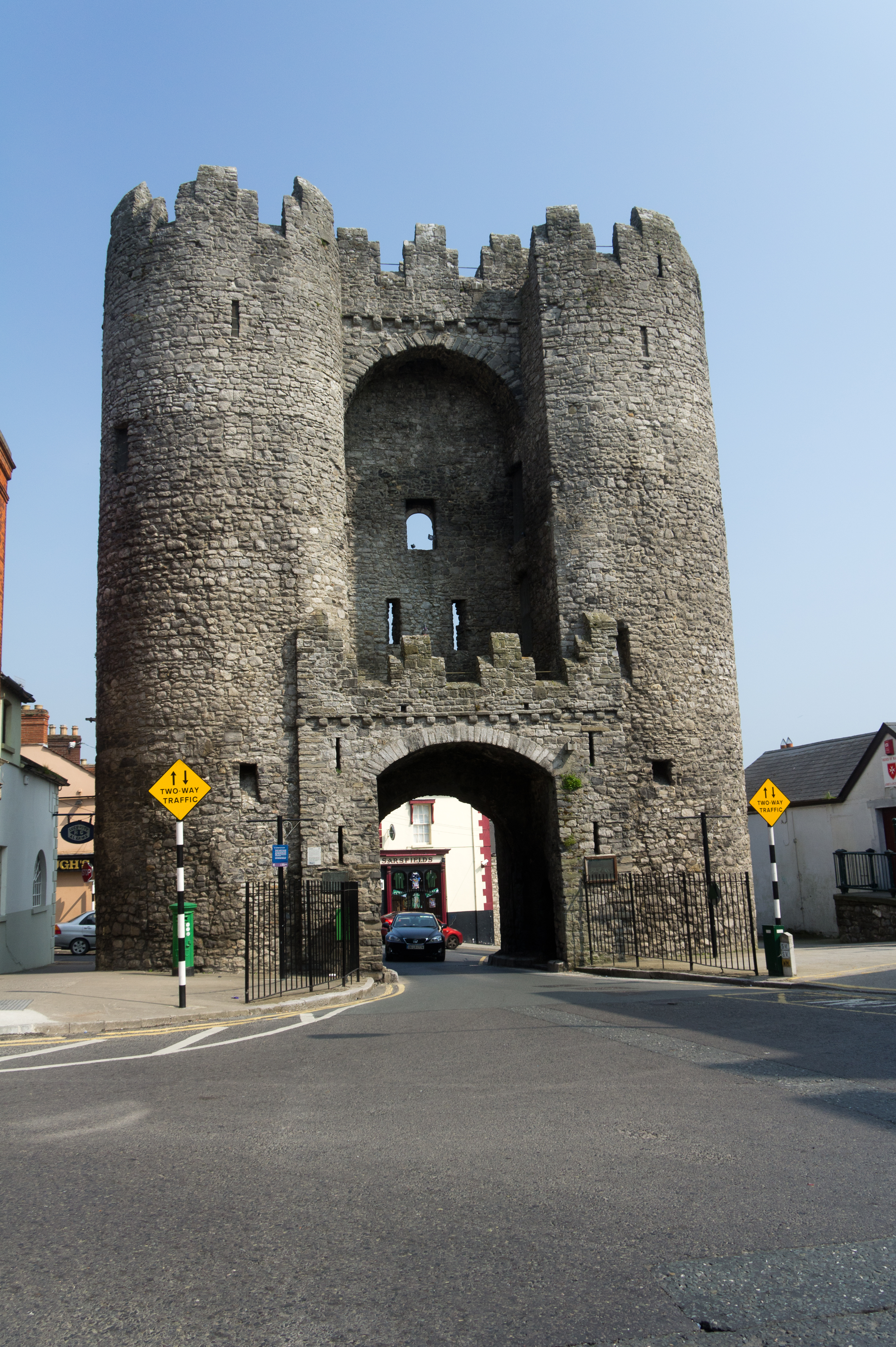
Drogheda, St. Laurences Gate

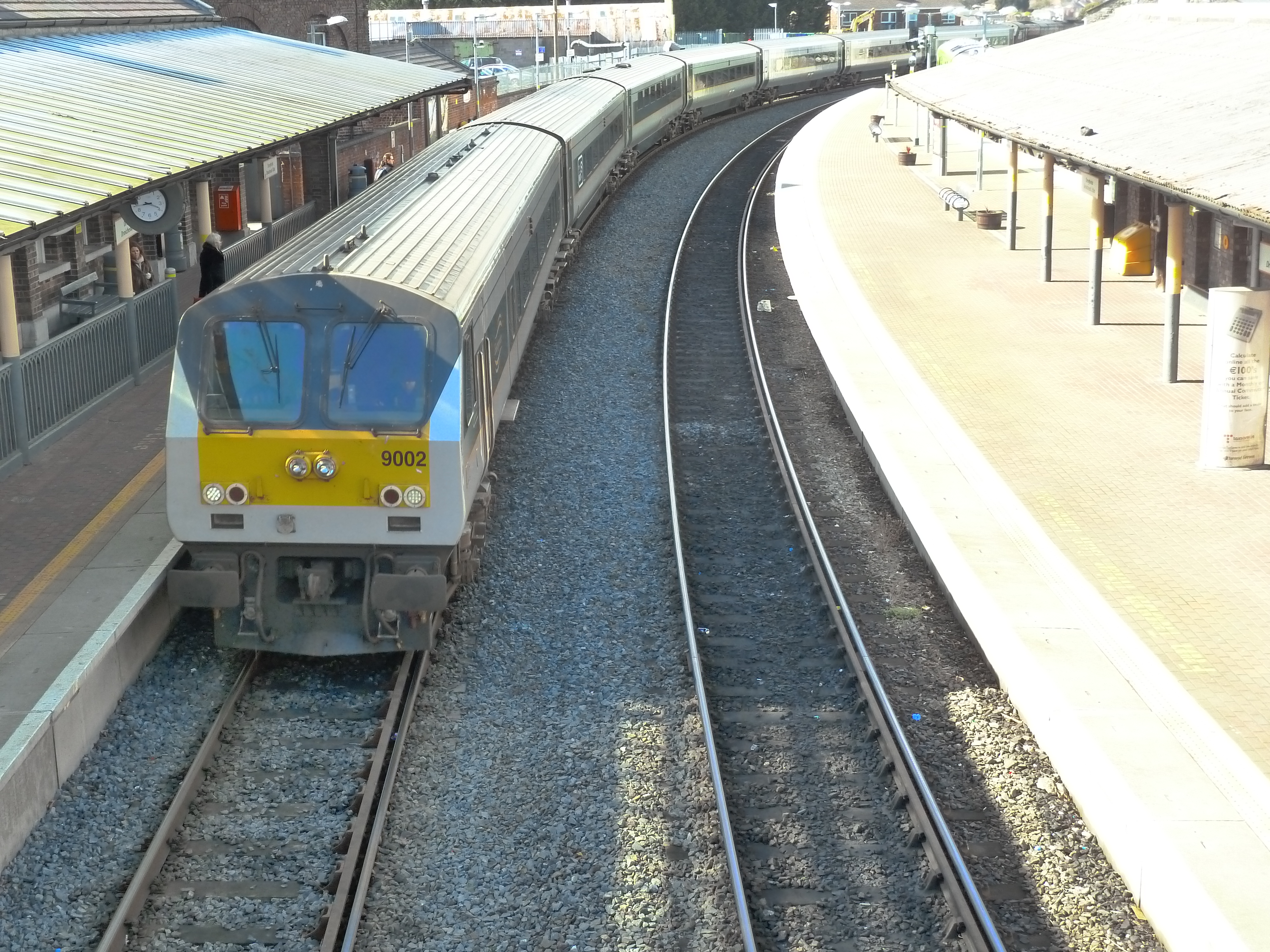
Drogheda railway station with the Enterprise

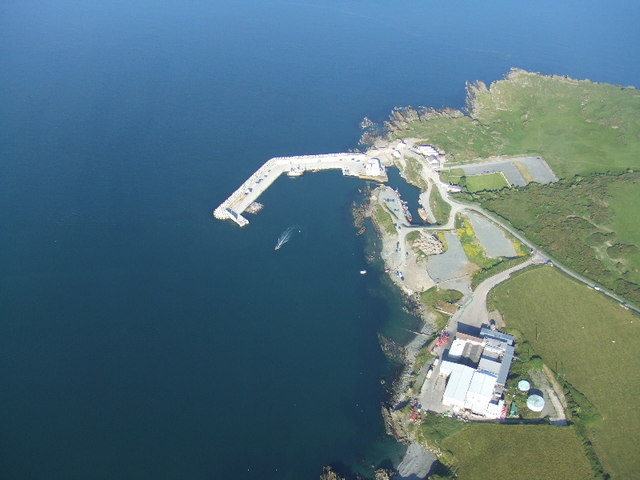
Clogherhead Harbour

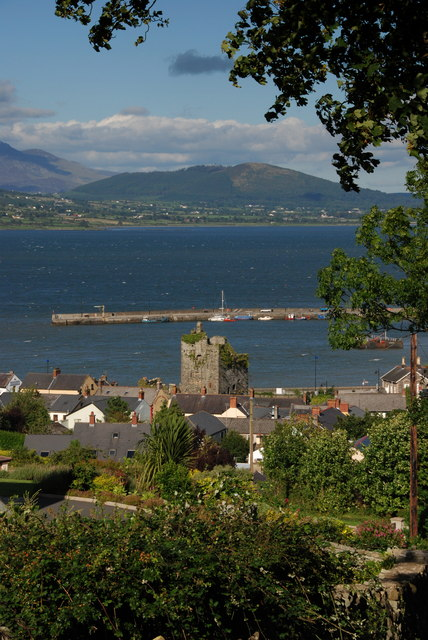
Carlingford Harbour

== See also ==
- List of abbeys and priories in the Republic of Ireland#County Louth
- List of castles in Ireland#County Louth
- Lord Lieutenant of Louth
- High Sheriff of Louth
- List of songs about Louth
