= Tinure =

Village in County Louth, Ireland

Tinure Tigh an Iúir (Irish)
- Village
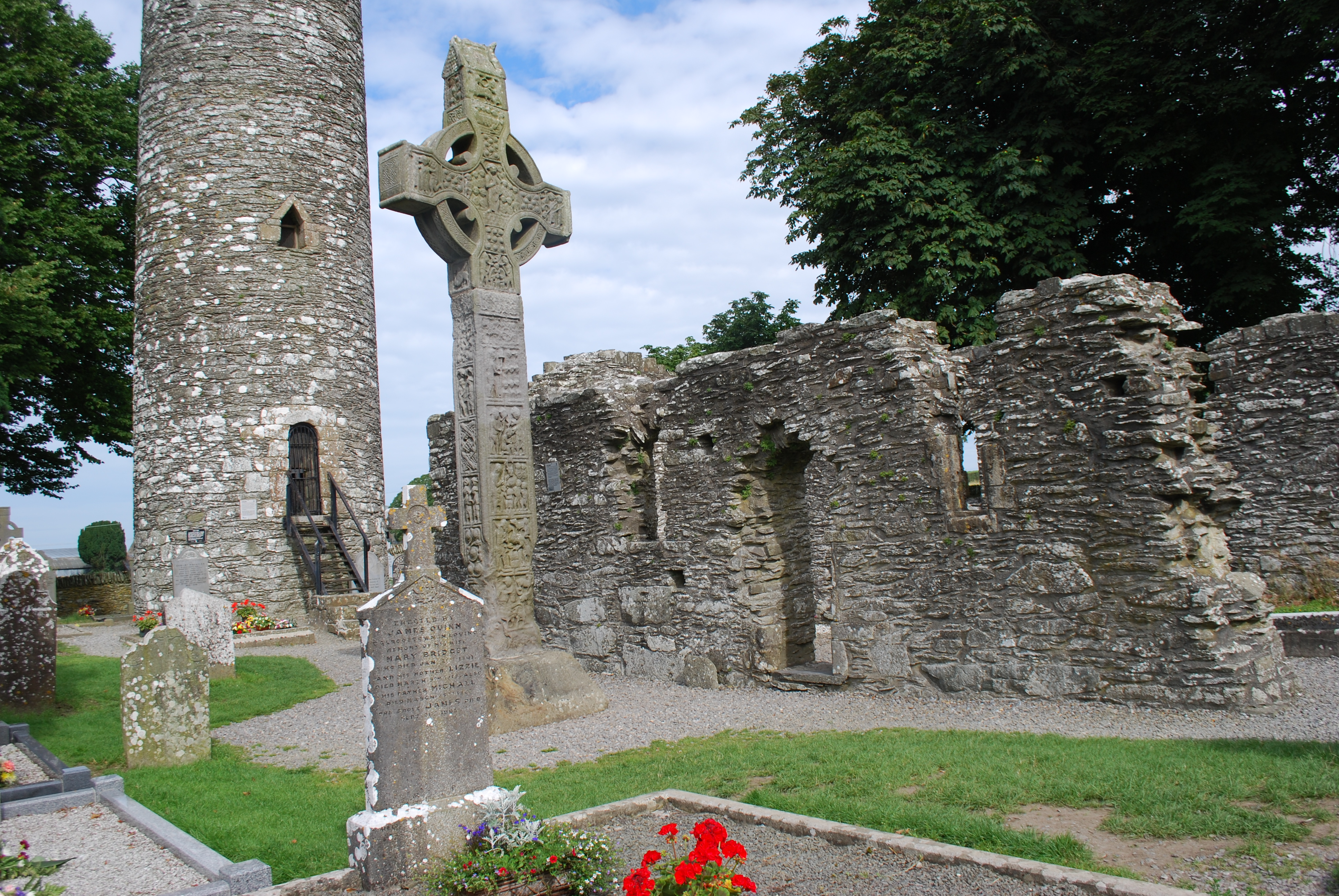
- The monastic settlement of Monasterboice lies just south of Tinure

- Location in Ireland
- Coordinates: 53°47′26″N 6°25′11″W
- Country: Ireland
- Province: Leinster
- County: County Louth

Population (2016)
  - Total: 464

Tinure (Irish: Tigh an Iúir, meaning 'house of the yew'), also Tenure, is a small village and townland in the parish of Monasterboice, County Louth, Ireland.

Tinure is predominantly rural in character, although there has been some new housing constructed in recent years. It falls within the scope of Drogheda Town, to its south, and Dunleer Town, to its north, which provide employment for many of the village's residents. There is a small business park located on the northern edge of the village, with a number of services firms on site. The village population increased from 296 inhabitants as of the 2002 census, to 464 as of the 2016 census. The population is almost evenly distributed between male and female, male at 230 and female at 234. This growth can be largely attributed to its proximity to the M1 motorway, which has improved transport linkages to the locality.

Tinure is known for its Roman Catholic Church, The Church of Our Lady of the Immaculate Conception, which was constructed in 1894. It is located on the main junction of the five roads that intersect the village.

== Public transport ==
Since June 2024 the village is served by Bus Éireann route 100 linking it to Drogheda, Dundalk and other locations along the route.

== See also ==
- List of towns and villages in Ireland
