= Louth, County Louth =

Village in County Louth, Ireland

Louth Lú (Irish)
- Village
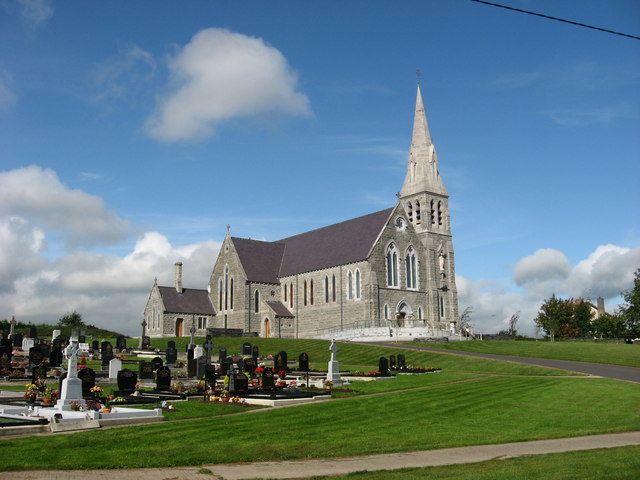
- Church of the Immaculate Conception, Louth

- Location in Ireland
- Coordinates: 53°57′03″N 6°32′26″W
- Country: Ireland
- Province: Leinster
- County: County Louth
- Elevation: 34 m (112 ft)

Population (2016)
  - Total: 735
- Time zone: UTC+0 (WET)
  - Summer (DST): UTC-1 (IST (WEST))
- Irish Grid Reference: H957011

Louth (Irish: Lú) is a village at the heart of County Louth, Ireland. It is approximately 11 km south-west of Dundalk, 11 km to the neighbouring town of Ardee and 15 km south-east of Carrickmacross town in County Monaghan. The village gave its name to the county. Louth is in a barony and civil parish of the same name.

== Etymology ==
The village is named after Lugh, a god of the ancient Irish, and may once have been the site of a shrine dedicated to the god. Historically, the place-name was spelt in variously different ways such as; "Lughmhagh", "Lughmhadh" and "Lughbhadh". The first is thought to mean "Lugh's plain" or "Lugh's field", but the meaning of the other two is unclear. Lú is the modern simplified spelling.

== History ==
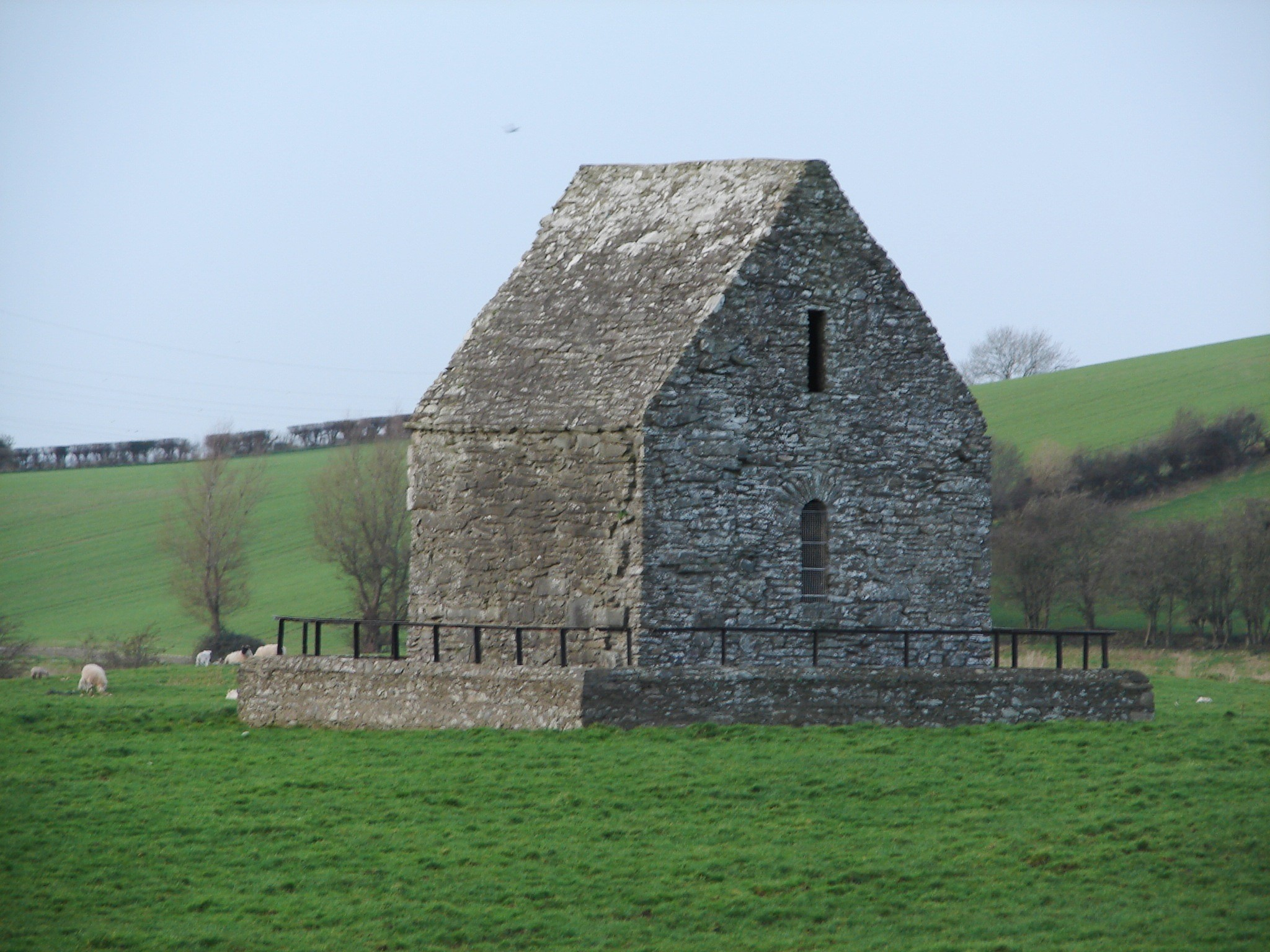
Saint Mochta's House, an ancient church in Louth Village.

According to tradition, Mochta—a Christian missionary from Britain—founded a monastery at Louth in the 6th century, known today as St. Mochta's House. In the 1920s the structure was completely dismantled and rebuilt in an attempt to save it from damage caused by ivy. In the 12th century, Saint Mary's Monastery was built approximately 50m east, but today lies in ruins after the dissolution of the monasteries under the English king Henry VIII. The current structure dates mainly from the 1300s it is believed that Edward Bruce of Scotland stayed at the priory in 1315, leading to the estate being fined by the English crown.

The remnants of a motte-and-bailey castle stand overlooking much of the village, on the edge of the Artoney townland. The eight meter tall motte - known locally as the Fairy Mound - is the highest point in the village and in Norman times had a wooden structure atop.

Until early in the 21st century, the village was also home to the last remnants of St John's Abbey. The last standing portion of the walls of the monastery, a 12-foot-high (3.7 m), 4-foot-wide (1.2 m) piece known locally as The Pinnacle, suddenly collapsed overnight.

The Roman Catholic Church of the Immaculate Conception, which was built in 1892, sits atop a hill overlooking the village and surrounding area. Its interior was destroyed in 2003 by an accidental fire, started during renovation work, leaving only the exterior walls and spire standing. In early 2006, it reopened with a renovated modern-style interior.

The local GAA team took the name St. Mochtas and play at the nearby Pairc Mochta founded in 1949, in honour of the saint who founded the small church in the village in the 6th century. The local primary school, St. Mochta's NS, was established in 1973.

The population of the village doubled from 373 inhabitants as of the 1991 census to 735 people as of the 2016 census.

== Notable people ==
- Declan Byrne is a native of Louth.
- Denis Faul (1932–2006), Roman Catholic priest and civil rights campaigner, was born in Louth.
- Eddie Filgate (1915–2017), a former Fianna Fáil Teachta Dála (TD), lived on the outskirts of the village in the Priorstate townland.

== See also ==
- List of towns and villages in Ireland
- List of abbeys and priories in Ireland (County Louth)
