= 17th Dáil =

TDs from 1961 to 1965

←	16th Dáil	18th Dáil	→

Overview
- Legislative body: Dáil Éireann
- Jurisdiction: Ireland
- Meeting place: Leinster House
- Term: 11 October 1961 – 11 March 1965
- Election: 1961 general election
- Government: 10th government of Ireland
- Members: 144
- Ceann Comhairle: Patrick Hogan
- Taoiseach: Seán Lemass
- Tánaiste: Seán MacEntee
- Chief Whip: Joseph Brennan
- Leader of the Opposition: James Dillon

Sessions
- 1st: 11 October 1961 – 26 July 1962
- 2nd: 30 October 1962 – 19 July 1963
- 3rd: 23 October 1963 – 1 July 1964
- 4th: 3 November 1964 – 11 March 1965

The 17th Dáil was elected at the 1961 general election on 4 October 1961 and met on 11 October 1961. The members of Dáil Éireann, the house of representatives of the Oireachtas (legislature) of Ireland, are known as TDs. It sat with the 10th Seanad as the two Houses of the Oireachtas.

On 18 March 1965 President Éamon de Valera dissolved the Dáil on the request of Taoiseach Seán Lemass. The 17th Dáil lasted 3 years, 158 days.

== Composition of the 17th Dáil ==
- 10th government

Party	Oct. 1957	Mar. 1961	Change
Fianna Fáil	70	71	▲1
Fine Gael	47	48	▲1
Labour (Note: National Progressive Democrats merged into Labour in November 1963.)	16	17	▲1
Clann na Talmhan	2	1	▼1
National Progressive Democrats	2	—N/a	▼2
Clann na Poblachta	1	1	Steady
Independent	6	5	▼1
Ceann Comhairle	—N/a	1	▲1
Total	144		

Fianna Fáil formed the 10th government of Ireland led by Seán Lemass as Taoiseach.

=== Graphical representation ===
This is a graphical comparison of party strengths in the 17th Dáil from October 1961. This was not the official seating plan.

== Ceann Comhairle ==
On the meeting of the Dáil, Patrick Hogan (Lab), who had served as Ceann Comhairle since 1951, was proposed by Seán Lemass (FF) and seconded by James Dillon (FG) for the position. His election was approved without a vote.

== TDs by constituency ==
The list of the 144 TDs elected, is given in alphabetical order by Dáil constituency.

Members of the 17th Dáil
Constituency	Name	Party
Carlow–Kilkenny	Patrick Crotty	Fine Gael
Carlow–Kilkenny	Jim Gibbons	Fianna Fáil
Carlow–Kilkenny	Desmond Governey	Fine Gael
Carlow–Kilkenny	Martin Medlar	Fianna Fáil
Carlow–Kilkenny	Séamus Pattison	Labour
Cavan	Séamus Dolan	Fianna Fáil
Cavan	Patrick O'Reilly	Fine Gael
Cavan	Paddy Smith	Fianna Fáil
Clare	Patrick Hogan	Labour
Clare	Patrick Hillery	Fianna Fáil
Clare	William Murphy	Fine Gael
Clare	Seán Ó Ceallaigh	Fianna Fáil
Cork Borough	Stephen Barrett	Fine Gael
Cork Borough	Anthony Barry	Fine Gael
Cork Borough	Seán Casey	Labour
Cork Borough	John Galvin	Fianna Fáil
Cork Borough	Jack Lynch	Fianna Fáil
Cork Mid	Dan Desmond	Labour
Cork Mid	Seán McCarthy	Fianna Fáil
Cork Mid	Con Meaney	Fianna Fáil
Cork Mid	Denis O'Sullivan	Fine Gael
Cork North-East	Richard Barry	Fine Gael
Cork North-East	Philip Burton	Fine Gael
Cork North-East	Martin Corry	Fianna Fáil
Cork North-East	Patrick McAuliffe	Labour
Cork North-East	John Moher	Fianna Fáil
Cork South-West	Seán Collins	Fine Gael
Cork South-West	Edward Cotter	Fianna Fáil
Cork South-West	Michael Pat Murphy	Labour
Donegal North-East	Neil Blaney	Fianna Fáil
Donegal North-East	Liam Cunningham	Fianna Fáil
Donegal North-East	Paddy Harte	Fine Gael
Donegal South-West	Joseph Brennan	Fianna Fáil
Donegal South-West	Cormac Breslin	Fianna Fáil
Donegal South-West	Patrick O'Donnell	Fine Gael
Dublin County	Kevin Boland	Fianna Fáil
Dublin County	Patrick Burke	Fianna Fáil
Dublin County	Mark Clinton	Fine Gael
Dublin County	Seán Dunne	Independent
Dublin County	Éamon Rooney	Fine Gael
Dublin North-Central	Vivion de Valera	Fianna Fáil
Dublin North-Central	Celia Lynch	Fianna Fáil
Dublin North-Central	Patrick McGilligan	Fine Gael
Dublin North-Central	Frank Sherwin	Independent
Dublin North-East	Jack Belton	Fine Gael
Dublin North-East	Patrick Byrne	Fine Gael
Dublin North-East	George Colley	Fianna Fáil
Dublin North-East	Charles Haughey	Fianna Fáil
Dublin North-East	Eugene Timmons	Fianna Fáil
Dublin North-West	Declan Costello	Fine Gael
Dublin North-West	Richard Gogan	Fianna Fáil
Dublin North-West	Michael Mullen	Labour
Dublin South-Central	Joseph Barron	Clann na Poblachta
Dublin South-Central	Philip Brady	Fianna Fáil
Dublin South-Central	Patrick Cummins	Fianna Fáil
Dublin South-Central	Maurice E. Dockrell	Fine Gael
Dublin South-Central	Seán Lemass	Fianna Fáil
Dublin South-East	Noël Browne	National Progressive Democrats
Dublin South-East	John A. Costello	Fine Gael
Dublin South-East	Seán MacEntee	Fianna Fáil
Dublin South-West	Robert Briscoe	Fianna Fáil
Dublin South-West	James Carroll	Independent
Dublin South-West	Noel Lemass	Fianna Fáil
Dublin South-West	James O'Keeffe	Fine Gael
Dublin South-West	Richie Ryan	Fine Gael
Dún Laoghaire and Rathdown	Seán Brady	Fianna Fáil
Dún Laoghaire and Rathdown	Lionel Booth	Fianna Fáil
Dún Laoghaire and Rathdown	Liam Cosgrave	Fine Gael
Dún Laoghaire and Rathdown	H. Percy Dockrell	Fine Gael
Galway East	Michael Carty	Fianna Fáil
Galway East	Michael Donnellan	Clann na Talmhan
Galway East	Brigid Hogan-O'Higgins	Fine Gael
Galway East	Michael F. Kitt	Fianna Fáil
Galway East	Anthony Millar	Fianna Fáil
Galway West	Gerald Bartley	Fianna Fáil
Galway West	Fintan Coogan	Fine Gael
Galway West	Johnny Geoghegan	Fianna Fáil
Kerry North	Patrick Finucane	Independent
Kerry North	Tom McEllistrim	Fianna Fáil
Kerry North	Dan Spring	Labour
Kerry South	Patrick Connor	Fine Gael
Kerry South	Honor Crowley	Fianna Fáil
Kerry South	Timothy O'Connor	Fianna Fáil
Kildare	Brendan Crinion	Fianna Fáil
Kildare	Patrick Dooley	Fianna Fáil
Kildare	William Norton	Labour
Kildare	Gerard Sweetman	Fine Gael
Laois–Offaly	Kieran Egan	Fianna Fáil
Laois–Offaly	Nicholas Egan	Fianna Fáil
Laois–Offaly	Oliver J. Flanagan	Fine Gael
Laois–Offaly	Patrick Lalor	Fianna Fáil
Laois–Offaly	Tom O'Higgins	Fine Gael
Limerick East	Paddy Clohessy	Fianna Fáil
Limerick East	Stephen Coughlan	Labour
Limerick East	Tom O'Donnell	Fine Gael
Limerick East	Donogh O'Malley	Fianna Fáil
Limerick West	James Collins	Fianna Fáil
Limerick West	Denis Jones	Fine Gael
Limerick West	Donnchadh Ó Briain	Fianna Fáil
Longford–Westmeath	Frank Carter	Fianna Fáil
Longford–Westmeath	Michael Kennedy	Fianna Fáil
Longford–Westmeath	Seán Mac Eoin	Fine Gael
Longford–Westmeath	Joe Sheridan	Independent
Louth	Frank Aiken	Fianna Fáil
Louth	Paddy Donegan	Fine Gael
Louth	Pádraig Faulkner	Fianna Fáil
Mayo North	Michael Browne	Fine Gael
Mayo North	Phelim Calleary	Fianna Fáil
Mayo North	Joseph Lenehan	Independent
Mayo South	Joseph Blowick	Clann na Talmhan
Mayo South	Seán Flanagan	Fianna Fáil
Mayo South	Henry Kenny	Fine Gael
Mayo South	Mícheál Ó Móráin	Fianna Fáil
Meath	Denis Farrelly	Fine Gael
Meath	Michael Hilliard	Fianna Fáil
Meath	James Tully	Labour
Monaghan	Erskine H. Childers	Fianna Fáil
Monaghan	James Dillon	Fine Gael
Monaghan	Patrick Mooney	Fianna Fáil
Roscommon	James Burke	Fine Gael
Roscommon	Brian Lenihan	Fianna Fáil
Roscommon	Jack McQuillan	National Progressive Democrats
Roscommon	Patrick J. Reynolds	Fine Gael
Sligo–Leitrim	James Gallagher	Fianna Fáil
Sligo–Leitrim	Eugene Gilbride	Fianna Fáil
Sligo–Leitrim	Eugene Gilhawley	Fine Gael
Sligo–Leitrim	Joseph McLoughlin	Fine Gael
Tipperary North	Thomas Dunne	Fine Gael
Tipperary North	John Fanning	Fianna Fáil
Tipperary North	Patrick Tierney	Labour
Tipperary South	Dan Breen	Fianna Fáil
Tipperary South	Michael Davern	Fianna Fáil
Tipperary South	Patrick Hogan	Fine Gael
Tipperary South	Seán Treacy	Labour
Waterford	Thomas Kyne	Labour
Waterford	Thaddeus Lynch	Fine Gael
Waterford	John Ormonde	Fianna Fáil
Wexford	Lorcan Allen	Fianna Fáil
Wexford	Brendan Corish	Labour
Wexford	Anthony Esmonde	Fine Gael
Wexford	James Ryan	Fianna Fáil
Wicklow	Paudge Brennan	Fianna Fáil
Wicklow	James Everett	Labour
Wicklow	Michael O'Higgins	Fine Gael

== Changes ==
Date	Constituency	Loss	Gain	Note
11 October 1961	Clare	Labour	Ceann Comhairle	Patrick Hogan takes office as Ceann Comhairle
23 February 1963	Dublin North-East	Fine Gael		Death of Jack Belton
30 May 1963	Dublin North-East		Fine Gael	Paddy Belton holds seat vacated by the death of his brother Jack Belton
11 October 1963	Cork Borough	Fianna Fáil		Death of John Galvin
13 November 1963	Dublin County	Independent	Labour	Seán Dunne joins the Labour Party
27 November 1963	Dublin South-East	National Progressive Democrats	Labour	Noël Browne disbands the National Progressive Democrats and joins the Labour Party
27 November 1963	Roscommon	National Progressive Democrats	Labour	Jack McQuillan disbands the National Progressive Democrats and joins the Labour Party
4 December 1963	Kildare	Labour		Death of William Norton
19 February 1964	Cork Borough		Fianna Fáil	Sheila Galvin holds seat vacated by the death of her husband John Galvin
19 February 1964	Kildare		Fianna Fáil	Terence Boylan gains seat vacated by the death of Norton
12 May 1964	Roscommon	Fine Gael		Death of James Burke
8 July 1964	Roscommon		Fine Gael	Joan Burke holds seat vacated by the death of her husband James Burke
27 September 1964	Galway East	Clann na Talmhan		Death of Michael Donnellan
3 December 1964	Galway East		Fine Gael	John Donnellan gains seat vacated by the death of his father Michael Donnellan
9 December 1964	Cork Mid	Labour		Death of Dan Desmond
10 March 1965	Cork Mid		Labour	Eileen Desmond holds seat vacated by the death of her husband Dan Desmond (Note: On the request of Taoiseach Seán Lemass, the 17th Dáil was dissolved on 18 March 1965 before Desmond could assume her seat.)
