= 1952 Mayo North by-election =

By-election to the 14th Dáil

- 26 June 1952
- Turnout: 24,400 (67.5%)
	Calleary	Lindsay	McGrath
Nominee	Phelim Calleary	Patrick Lindsay	Martin McGrath
Party	Fianna Fáil	Fine Gael	Clann na Poblachta
First preferences	11,782	5,468	4,743
Percentage	48.3%	22.4%	19.4%
Final count	12,441	11,040	–
TD before election
P. J. Ruttledge
Fianna Fáil
TD after election
Phelim Calleary
Fianna Fáil

A Dáil by-election was held in the constituency of Mayo North in Ireland on Thursday, 26 June 1952, to fill a vacancy in the 14th Dáil. It followed the death of Fianna Fáil Teachta Dála (TD) P. J. Ruttledge on 8 May 1952. The writ of election to fill the vacancy was agreed by the Dáil on 5 June 1952.

The by-election was won by the Fianna Fáil candidate Phelim Calleary.

Two other by-elections were held on the same day; in Limerick East and Waterford. The runner-up Patrick Lindsay of Fine Gael, was elected for Mayo North at the 1954 general election.

== Result ==
1952 Mayo North by-election
Party	Candidate	FPv%	Count		
Party	Candidate	FPv%	1	2	3
Fianna Fáil	Phelim Calleary	48.3	11,782	12,034	12,441
Fine Gael	Patrick Lindsay	22.4	5,468	6,778	11,040
Clann na Poblachta	Martin McGrath	19.4	4,743	5,443	
Clann na Talmhan	Frank Devanny	9.9	2,407		
Electorate: 36,165 Valid: 24,400 Quota: 12,201 Turnout: 67.5%
