= Mayo North (Dáil constituency) =

Dáil constituency (1923–1969)

- Former Dáil constituency

Former constituency
- Created: 1923
- Abolished: 1969
- Seats: 4 (1923–1937); 3 (1937–1969)
- Local government area: County Mayo
- Created from: Mayo North and West; Sligo–Mayo East
- Replaced by: Mayo East; Mayo West

Mayo North was a parliamentary constituency represented in Dáil Éireann, the lower house of the Irish parliament or Oireachtas from 1923 to 1969. The method of election was proportional representation by means of the single transferable vote (PR-STV).

== History ==
The constituency was created under the Electoral Act 1923 for the 1923 general election to Dáil Éireann, whose members formed the 4th Dáil.

From 1923 to 1937, Mayo North elected 4 deputies (Teachtaí Dála, commonly known as TDs). Under the Electoral (Revision of Constituencies) Act 1935, this was reduced to 3 with effect from the 1937 general election.

It was abolished under the Electoral (Amendment) Act 1969, when it and Mayo South were replaced by the two new constituencies of Mayo East and Mayo West.

== Boundaries ==
The constituency covered the county electoral areas of Ballina, Killala and Swinford, in the administrative county of Mayo.

== TDs ==
Teachtaí Dála (TDs) for Mayo North 1923–1969
Key to parties: CnaG = Cumann na nGaedheal; CnaT = Clann na Talmhan; FF = Fianna Fáil; FG = Fine Gael; Ind. = Independent; Rep = Republican; SF = Sinn Féin
Dáil	Election	Deputy (Party)	Deputy (Party)	Deputy (Party)	Deputy (Party)
4th	1923	P. J. Ruttledge (Rep)	Henry Coyle (CnaG)	John Crowley (Rep)	Joseph McGrath (CnaG)
4th	1924 by-election	P. J. Ruttledge (Rep)	John Madden (Rep)	John Crowley (Rep)	Joseph McGrath (CnaG)
4th	1925 by-election	P. J. Ruttledge (Rep)	John Madden (Rep)	John Crowley (Rep)	Michael Tierney (CnaG)
5th	1927 (Jun)	P. J. Ruttledge (FF)	John Madden (SF)	Michael Davis (CnaG)	Mark Henry (CnaG)
6th	1927 (Sep)	P. J. Ruttledge (FF)	Micheál Clery (FF)	Michael Davis (CnaG)	Mark Henry (CnaG)
7th	1932	P. J. Ruttledge (FF)	Micheál Clery (FF)	Michael Davis (CnaG)	Patrick O'Hara (CnaG)
8th	1933	P. J. Ruttledge (FF)	Micheál Clery (FF)	Michael Davis (CnaG)	James Morrisroe (CnaG)
9th	1937	P. J. Ruttledge (FF)	John Munnelly (FF)	Patrick Browne (FG)	3 seats 1937–1969
10th	1938	P. J. Ruttledge (FF)	John Munnelly (FF)	Patrick Browne (FG)	3 seats 1937–1969
11th	1943	P. J. Ruttledge (FF)	James Kilroy (FF)	Patrick Browne (FG)	3 seats 1937–1969
12th	1944	P. J. Ruttledge (FF)	James Kilroy (FF)	Patrick Browne (FG)	3 seats 1937–1969
13th	1948	P. J. Ruttledge (FF)	James Kilroy (FF)	Patrick Browne (FG)	3 seats 1937–1969
14th	1951	P. J. Ruttledge (FF)	Thomas O'Hara (CnaT)	Patrick Browne (FG)	3 seats 1937–1969
14th	1952 by-election	Phelim Calleary (FF)	Thomas O'Hara (CnaT)	Patrick Browne (FG)	3 seats 1937–1969
15th	1954	Phelim Calleary (FF)	Thomas O'Hara (CnaT)	Patrick Lindsay (FG)	3 seats 1937–1969
16th	1957	Phelim Calleary (FF)	Seán Doherty (FF)	Patrick Lindsay (FG)	3 seats 1937–1969
17th	1961	Phelim Calleary (FF)	Joseph Lenehan (Ind.)	Michael Browne (FG)	3 seats 1937–1969
18th	1965	Phelim Calleary (FF)	Patrick Lindsay (FG)	Thomas O'Hara (FG)	3 seats 1937–1969
19th	1969	Constituency abolished. See Mayo East and Mayo West			

Note: The columns in this table are used only for presentational purposes, and no significance should be attached to the order of columns. For details of the order in which seats were won at each election, see the detailed results of that election.

== Elections ==
*: Outgoing TD

=== 1965 general election ===
1965 general election: Mayo North
Party	Candidate	FPv%	Count				
Party	Candidate	FPv%	1	2	3	4	5
Fianna Fáil	Phelim Calleary	21.7	4,748	4,785	5,436	5,786	
Fianna Fáil	Joseph Lenehan	19.1	4,190	4,218	5,089	5,240	5,313
Fine Gael	Thomas O'Hara	18.0	3,933	3,988	4,024	5,260	5,327
Fine Gael	Patrick Lindsay	16.4	3,598	3,659	3,821	5,378	5,428
Fine Gael	Michael Browne	15.3	3,350	3,410	3,429		
Fianna Fáil	Thomas Corrigan	8.2	1,795	1,815			
Labour	Seán Davis	1.3	285				
Electorate: 32,073 Valid: 21,899 Quota: 5,475 Turnout: 68.3%

=== 1961 general election ===
1961 general election: Mayo North
Party	Candidate	FPv%	Count					
Party	Candidate	FPv%	1	2	3	4	5	6
Fianna Fáil	Phelim Calleary	21.9	4,684	4,757	5,376			
Fine Gael	Michael Browne	15.4	3,294	3,441	3,497	5,292	5,745	
Independent	Joseph Lenehan	14.0	2,990	3,048	3,085	3,695	4,181	4,247
Fine Gael	Patrick Lindsay	13.3	2,847	2,900	2,945			
Clann na Talmhan	Thomas O'Hara	13.3	2,846	2,958	3,325	3,639	3,925	4,064
Fianna Fáil	John Garrett	12.4	2,647	2,675	2,988	3,067		
Fianna Fáil	Martin Cassidy	7.1	1,511	1,519				
Labour	John Reilly	2.5	531					
Electorate: 33,914 Valid: 21,350 Quota: 5,338 Turnout: 63.0%

=== 1957 general election ===
1957 general election: Mayo North
Party	Candidate	FPv%	Count			
Party	Candidate	FPv%	1	2	3	4
Fianna Fáil	Phelim Calleary	27.7	6,415			
Fine Gael	Patrick Lindsay	16.8	3,880	3,901	4,130	5,951
Clann na Talmhan	Thomas O'Hara	15.8	3,656	3,685	3,802	4,680
Fianna Fáil	Seán Doherty	15.8	3,648	4,165	6,318	
Fine Gael	Patrick Browne	12.5	2,892	2,920	2,980	
Fianna Fáil	Seán Lynchehaun	11.5	2,662	2,693		
Electorate: 34,528 Valid: 23,153 Quota: 5,789 Turnout: 67.1%

=== 1954 general election ===
1954 general election: Mayo North
Party	Candidate	FPv%	Count							
Party	Candidate	FPv%	1	2	3	4	5	6	7	8
Fianna Fáil	Phelim Calleary	23.5	5,874	6,222	6,420					
Clann na Talmhan	Thomas O'Hara	14.2	3,552	3,563	3,608	3,611	4,364	4,584	5,476	5,812
Fine Gael	Patrick Lindsay	13.1	3,277	3,305	3,560	3,570	4,161	4,205	6,600	
Fine Gael	Patrick Browne	13.1	3,272	3,280	3,337	3,344	3,712	3,897		
Fianna Fáil	Michael Kilroy	11.5	2,868	3,054	3,207	3,248	3,308	5,047	5,187	5,193
Fianna Fáil	John Garrett	8.1	2,039	2,253	2,371	2,407	2,468			
Clann na Poblachta	Martin McGrath	6.7	1,678	1,688	2,226	2,237				
Clann na Poblachta	Denis Gallagher	5.3	1,318	1,608						
Independent	James Ginnelly	4.6	1,151							
Electorate: 35,571 Valid: 25,029 Quota: 6,258 Turnout: 70.4%

=== 1952 by-election ===
Following the death of Fianna Fáil TD P. J. Ruttledge, a by-election was held on 26 June 1952. The seat was won by the Fianna Fáil candidate Phelim Calleary.

1952 by-election: Mayo North
Party	Candidate	FPv%	Count		
Party	Candidate	FPv%	1	2	3
Fianna Fáil	Phelim Calleary	48.3	11,782	12,034	12,441
Fine Gael	Patrick Lindsay	22.4	5,468	6,778	11,040
Clann na Poblachta	Martin McGrath	19.4	4,743	5,443	
Clann na Talmhan	Frank Devanny	9.9	2,407		
Electorate: 36,165 Valid: 24,400 Quota: 12,201 Turnout: 67.5%

=== 1951 general election ===
1951 general election: Mayo North
Party	Candidate	FPv%	Count				
Party	Candidate	FPv%	1	2	3	4	5
Fianna Fáil	P. J. Ruttledge	21.5	5,348	5,903	5,946	6,149	6,185
Fianna Fáil	James Kilroy	17.1	4,259	5,135	5,559	5,672	5,689
Fine Gael	Patrick Browne	15.6	3,867	3,901	5,940	6,834	
Clann na Talmhan	Thomas O'Hara	14.5	3,600	3,636	3,744	5,809	6,205
Clann na Poblachta	Martin McGrath	12.6	3,131	3,196	3,495		
Fine Gael	Joseph Lenehan	12.0	2,981	3,033			
Fianna Fáil	Frank Moran	6.7	1,663				
Electorate: 36,316 Valid: 24,849 Quota: 6,213 Turnout: 68.4%

=== 1948 general election ===
1948 general election: Mayo North
Party	Candidate	FPv%	Count							
Party	Candidate	FPv%	1	2	3	4	5	6	7	8
Fianna Fáil	P. J. Ruttledge	21.1	5,320	5,421	5,436	5,464	5,543	5,960	6,069	6,110
Fine Gael	Patrick Browne	17.0	4,281	4,401	4,452	5,281	5,425	5,481	6,236	6,611
Fianna Fáil	James Kilroy	15.8	3,992	4,013	4,078	4,244	4,285	5,498	5,555	5,784
Clann na Poblachta	Michael Hardy	8.8	2,220	2,258	2,365	2,395	3,344	3,402	3,804	4,871
Clann na Talmhan	James Forde	6.8	1,709	1,768	2,111	2,130	2,166	2,188		
Fianna Fáil	Seán Lynchehaun	6.6	1,655	1,659	1,971	2,042	2,060			
Clann na Poblachta	Martin McGrath	6.1	1,541	1,627	1,638	1,663				
Clann na Poblachta	Michael Hefferon	5.8	1,469	1,479	1,634	1,785	2,116	2,197	2,312	
Fine Gael	Patrick Lindsay	5.2	1,302	1,310	1,413					
Clann na Talmhan	James Ginnelly	4.8	1,211	1,233						
Independent	John Clarke	2.0	499							
Electorate: 37,602 Valid: 25,199 Quota: 6,300 Turnout: 67.0%

=== 1944 general election ===
1944 general election: Mayo North
Party	Candidate	FPv%	Count			
Party	Candidate	FPv%	1	2	3	4
Fianna Fáil	P. J. Ruttledge	27.8	6,818			
Fine Gael	Patrick Browne	19.9	4,875	4,916	6,075	6,230
Fianna Fáil	James Kilroy	18.7	4,602	5,079	5,463	7,812
Clann na Talmhan	Thomas O'Hara	15.3	3,748	3,787	3,902	4,014
Fianna Fáil	Seán Lynchahaun	10.6	2,597	2,708	2,884	
Fine Gael	Joseph Lenehan	7.8	1,917	1,927		
Electorate: 39,368 Valid: 24,557 Quota: 6,140 Turnout: 62.4%

=== 1943 general election ===
Full figures on the fourth and fifth counts are unavailable.

1943 general election: Mayo North
Party	Candidate	FPv%	Count					
Party	Candidate	FPv%	1	2	3	4	5	6
Fianna Fáil	P. J. Ruttledge	22.7	5,602	5,767	5,824	N\A	7,125	
Fine Gael	Patrick Browne	15.4	3,789	3,902	5,284	N\A	N\A	6,057
Fianna Fáil	James Kilroy	14.3	3,525	3,785	3,985	N\A	N\A	6,408
Fianna Fáil	Michael Hardy	14.0	3,446	3,499	3,534	3,577		
Clann na Talmhan	Thomas O'Hara	11.3	2,785	2,891	2,924	N\A	N\A	5,070
Clann na Talmhan	Niall McCormack	9.4	2,315	2,532	2,671			
Fine Gael	Patrick Lindsay	7.9	1,936	2,057				
Independent	Pádraig McAndrew	5.1	1,247					
Electorate: 39,368 Valid: 24,645 Quota: 6,162 Turnout: 62.6%

=== 1938 general election ===
The number of votes of Jordan on the 4th count is unavailable.

1938 general election: Mayo North
Party	Candidate	FPv%	Count			
Party	Candidate	FPv%	1	2	3	4
Fianna Fáil	P. J. Ruttledge	31.4	8,277			
Fine Gael	Patrick Browne	23.0	6,060	6,103	6,104	8,737
Fianna Fáil	John Munnelly	20.3	5,353	6,655		
Fianna Fáil	Thomas Jordan	14.2	3,749	4,065	4,133	N/A
Fine Gael	Patrick Lindsay	11.0	2,896	2,928	2,930	
Electorate: 38,186 Valid: 26,335 Quota: 6,584 Turnout: 69.0%

=== 1937 general election ===
1937 general election: Mayo North
Party	Candidate	FPv%	Count				
Party	Candidate	FPv%	1	2	3	4	5
Fianna Fáil	P. J. Ruttledge	31.3	7,934				
Fianna Fáil	John Munnelly	17.7	4,497	5,152	5,276	5,424	5,441
Fine Gael	Patrick Browne	17.7	4,481	4,510	5,835	8,761	
Fianna Fáil	Michael Kilroy	13.8	3,504	4,358	4,434	4,511	4,531
Fine Gael	Michael O'Hara	11.9	3,019	3,054	3,393		
Fine Gael	Patrick Lindsay	7.6	1,940	1,957			
Electorate: 38,170 Valid: 25,375 Quota: 6,344 Turnout: 66.5%

=== 1933 general election ===
1933 general election: Mayo North
Party	Candidate	FPv%	Count				
Party	Candidate	FPv%	1	2	3	4	5
Fianna Fáil	P. J. Ruttledge	24.9	8,430				
Fianna Fáil	Micheál Clery	18.7	6,311	7,682			
Cumann na nGaedheal	Michael Davis	18.2	6,172	6,187	6,188	8,303	
Cumann na nGaedheal	James Morrisroe	16.1	5,434	5,441	5,459	5,780	7,303
Fianna Fáil	John Munnelly	14.5	4,914	5,171	6,062	6,133	6,145
Cumann na nGaedheal	John Corcoran	7.6	2,575	2,587	2,591		
Electorate: 42,501 Valid: 33,836 Quota: 6,768 Turnout: 79.6%

=== 1932 general election ===
1932 general election: Mayo North
Party	Candidate	FPv%	Count			
Party	Candidate	FPv%	1	2	3	4
Fianna Fáil	P. J. Ruttledge	27.5	8,690			
Cumann na nGaedheal	Patrick O'Hara	18.5	5,853	5,878	5,884	6,973
Cumann na nGaedheal	Michael Davis	18.4	5,809	5,850	5,856	6,383
Fianna Fáil	Micheál Clery	17.2	5,433	7,355		
Fianna Fáil	John Munnelly	11.7	3,704	4,059	5,082	5,388
Cumann na nGaedheal	Thomas J. O'Reilly	6.6	2,088	2,119	2,123	
Electorate: 42,229 Valid: 31,577 Quota: 6,316 Turnout: 74.8%

=== September 1927 general election ===
September 1927 general election: Mayo North
Party	Candidate	FPv%	Count				
Party	Candidate	FPv%	1	2	3	4	5
Fianna Fáil	P. J. Ruttledge	28.6	8,560				
Cumann na nGaedheal	Michael Davis	24.9	7,464				
Cumann na nGaedheal	Mark Henry	18.5	5,550	5,585	6,231		
Fianna Fáil	Micheál Clery	10.2	3,062	4,963	4,994	4,998	7,933
Fianna Fáil	John Munnelly	9.1	2,727	3,285	3,313	3,323	
Cumann na nGaedheal	Thomas J. O'Reilly	8.7	2,615	2,685	3,448	3,669	3,850
Electorate: 44,704 Valid: 29,978 Quota: 5,996 Turnout: 67.1%

=== June 1927 general election ===
June 1927 general election: Mayo North
Party	Candidate	FPv%	Count					
Party	Candidate	FPv%	1	2	3	4	5	6
Cumann na nGaedheal	Michael Davis	22.9	6,643					
Fianna Fáil	P. J. Ruttledge	20.8	6,020					
Cumann na nGaedheal	Mark Henry	13.1	3,787	4,269	4,270	4,382	6,022	
Sinn Féin	John Madden	12.2	3,550	3,567	3,638	3,749	3,894	6,308
National League	Patrick O'Hara	11.2	3,237	3,303	3,313	3,513	3,670	3,900
Fianna Fáil	Micheál Clery	10.5	3,043	3,054	3,186	3,260	3,325	
Cumann na nGaedheal	Thomas J. O'Reilly	7.0	2,024	2,276	2,279	2,375		
Labour	Terence Waldron	2.4	683	700	705			
Electorate: 44,704 Valid: 28,987 Quota: 5,798 Turnout: 64.8%

=== 1925 by-election ===
Following the resignation of Cumann na nGaedheal TD Joseph McGrath, a by-election was held on 11 March 1925. The seat was won by the Cumann na nGaedheal candidate Michael Tierney.

1925 by-election: Mayo North
Party	Candidate	FPv%	Count
Party	Candidate	FPv%	1
Cumann na nGaedheal	Michael Tierney	57.7	18,385
Republican	Thomas Derrig	42.3	13,458
Electorate: 46,134 Valid: 31,843 Quota: 15,922 Turnout: 69.0%

=== 1924 by-election ===
Following the disqualification of Cumann na nGaedheal TD Henry Coyle, a by-election was held on 18 November 1924. The seat was won by the Republican candidate John Madden.

1924 by-election: Mayo North
Party	Candidate	FPv%	Count
Party	Candidate	FPv%	1
Republican	John Madden	51.5	14,628
Cumann na nGaedheal	Michael Tierney	48.5	13,758
Electorate: 46,134 Valid: 28,386 Quota: 14,194 Turnout: 61.5%

=== 1923 general election ===
1923 general election: Mayo North
Party	Candidate	FPv%	Count										
Party	Candidate	FPv%	1	2	3	4	5	6	7	8	9	10	11
Republican	P. J. Ruttledge	34.3	8,997										
Cumann na nGaedheal	Joseph McGrath	30.5	8,011										
Cumann na nGaedheal	Henry Coyle	11.4	2,997	3,036	3,975	3,986	4,018	4,034	4,208	4,554	4,582	4,903	8,132
Cumann na nGaedheal	Patrick O'Hara	8.0	2,097	2,113	3,122	3,212	3,234	3,246	3,347	3,582	3,617	4,689	
Cumann na nGaedheal	John Ruane	3.8	1,002	1,030	1,462	1,479	1,499	1,504	1,597	1,681	1,704		
Republican	John Crowley	3.2	832	3,462	3,472	3,479	3,498	3,670	3,836	3,912	4,969	5,034	5,104
Farmers' Party	Charles Flynn	3.0	793	824	981	988	1,069	1,085	1,138				
Labour	Archie Heron	2.5	647	726	796	806	820	833					
Republican	Joseph Kelly	1.8	478	1,173	1,179	1,191	1,197	1,286	1,329	1,361			
Farmers' Party	Timothy O'Sullivan	0.6	151	178	229	239							
Republican	Michael Keaveney	0.5	137	328	335	338	359						
Independent	Oliver J. O'Connor	0.4	99	111	192								
Electorate: 53,719 Valid: 26,241 Quota: 5,249 Turnout: 48.9%

== See also ==
- Dáil constituencies
- Politics of the Republic of Ireland
- Historic Dáil constituencies
- Elections in the Republic of Ireland
