= Michael Davis (Irish politician) =

Irish politician (1875–1944)

Teachta Dála
- In office June 1927 – July 1937
- Constituency: Mayo North

Personal details
- Born: 1875 County Mayo, Ireland
- Died: 30 March 1944 (aged 68–69) County Mayo, Ireland
- Party: Fine Gael
- Other political affiliations: Cumann na nGaedheal

Michael Davis (1875 – 30 March 1944) was an Irish Cumann na nGaedheal and later Fine Gael politician. He was first elected to Dáil Éireann as a Cumann na nGaedheal Teachta Dála (TD) for the Mayo North constituency at the June 1927 general election.

He was re-elected at each subsequent general election until he retired from politics at the 1937 general election.

| Dáil | Election | Deputy (Party) | Deputy (Party) | Deputy (Party) | Deputy (Party) |
|---|---|---|---|---|---|
| 4th | 1923 | P. J. Ruttledge (Rep) | Henry Coyle (CnaG) | John Crowley (Rep) | Joseph McGrath (CnaG) |
| 4th | 1924 by-election | P. J. Ruttledge (Rep) | John Madden (Rep) | John Crowley (Rep) | Joseph McGrath (CnaG) |
| 4th | 1925 by-election | P. J. Ruttledge (Rep) | John Madden (Rep) | John Crowley (Rep) | Michael Tierney (CnaG) |
| 5th | 1927 (Jun) | P. J. Ruttledge (FF) | John Madden (SF) | Michael Davis (CnaG) | Mark Henry (CnaG) |
| 6th | 1927 (Sep) | P. J. Ruttledge (FF) | Micheál Clery (FF) | Michael Davis (CnaG) | Mark Henry (CnaG) |
| 7th | 1932 | P. J. Ruttledge (FF) | Micheál Clery (FF) | Michael Davis (CnaG) | Patrick O'Hara (CnaG) |
| 8th | 1933 | P. J. Ruttledge (FF) | Micheál Clery (FF) | Michael Davis (CnaG) | James Morrisroe (CnaG) |
| 9th | 1937 | P. J. Ruttledge (FF) | John Munnelly (FF) | Patrick Browne (FG) | 3 seats 1937–1969 |
| 10th | 1938 | P. J. Ruttledge (FF) | John Munnelly (FF) | Patrick Browne (FG) | 3 seats 1937–1969 |
| 11th | 1943 | P. J. Ruttledge (FF) | James Kilroy (FF) | Patrick Browne (FG) | 3 seats 1937–1969 |
| 12th | 1944 | P. J. Ruttledge (FF) | James Kilroy (FF) | Patrick Browne (FG) | 3 seats 1937–1969 |
| 13th | 1948 | P. J. Ruttledge (FF) | James Kilroy (FF) | Patrick Browne (FG) | 3 seats 1937–1969 |
| 14th | 1951 | P. J. Ruttledge (FF) | Thomas O'Hara (CnaT) | Patrick Browne (FG) | 3 seats 1937–1969 |
| 14th | 1952 by-election | Phelim Calleary (FF) | Thomas O'Hara (CnaT) | Patrick Browne (FG) | 3 seats 1937–1969 |
| 15th | 1954 | Phelim Calleary (FF) | Thomas O'Hara (CnaT) | Patrick Lindsay (FG) | 3 seats 1937–1969 |
| 16th | 1957 | Phelim Calleary (FF) | Seán Doherty (FF) | Patrick Lindsay (FG) | 3 seats 1937–1969 |
| 17th | 1961 | Phelim Calleary (FF) | Joseph Lenehan (Ind.) | Michael Browne (FG) | 3 seats 1937–1969 |
| 18th | 1965 | Phelim Calleary (FF) | Patrick Lindsay (FG) | Thomas O'Hara (FG) | 3 seats 1937–1969 |
| 19th | 1969 | Constituency abolished. See Mayo East and Mayo West | | | |
