= 1924 Mayo North by-election =

By-election to the 4th Dáil

1924 North Mayo by-election
- 18 November 1924
- Turnout: 28,386 (61.5%)
	Madden	Tierney
Nominee	John Madden	Michael Tierney
Party	Republican	Cumann na nGaedheal
First preferences	14,628	13,758
Percentage	51.5%	48.5%
TD before election
Henry Coyle
Cumann na nGaedheal
TD after election
John Madden
Republican

A Dáil by-election was held in the constituency of Mayo North in the Irish Free State on Tuesday, 18 November 1924, to fill a vacancy in the 4th Dáil. Mayo North was a five seat constituency containing the county electoral areas of Ballina, Killala and Swinford.

Henry Coyle had been elected as a Teachta Dála (TD) for Cumann na nGaedheal at the 1923 general election. In April 1924, Coyle was sentenced to three years' imprisonment for bouncing cheques. Because his sentence was for more than six months, he was disqualified from the Oireachtas from 9 May 1924 under section 51 of the Electoral Act 1923. The writ of election to fill the vacancy was agreed by the Dáil on 28 October 1924. It was one of five by-elections agreed that day.

The Cumann na nGaedheal candidate, Michael Tierney, was a classicist in University College Dublin. The Republican candidate was John Madden.

== Result ==
The by-election was held on 18 November 1924. It was held on the same day as the 1924 Cork East by-election and the November 1924 Dublin South by-election. The seat was won by John Madden. The results in Dublin South and in Mayo North were the first defeats for Cumann na nGaedheal in Dáil by-elections. The 1924 Cork Borough by-election and the 1924 Donegal by-election were held later that week; Cumann na nGaedheal held both seats.

1924 Mayo North by-election
Party	Candidate	FPv%	Count
Party	Candidate	FPv%	1
Republican	John Madden	51.5	14,628
Cumann na nGaedheal	Michael Tierney	48.5	13,758
Electorate: 46,134 Valid: 28,386 Quota: 14,194 Turnout: 61.5%

Madden did not take his seat in the 4th Dáil. He remained with Sinn Féin after the majority of TDs left to join Fianna Fáil in 1926. He was re-elected at the June 1927 general election to the 5th Dáil, but did not contest the September 1927 general election.

Tierney was elected to the 4th Dáil at the 1925 Mayo North by-election.
