= Phelim Calleary =

Irish politician (1895–1974)

Teachta Dála
- In office June 1952 – July 1969
- Constituency: Mayo North

Personal details
- Born: 3 October 1895 Ballina, County Mayo, Ireland
- Died: 4 January 1974 (aged 78) Galway, Ireland
- Party: Fianna Fáil
- Children: Seán Calleary
- Relatives: Dara Calleary (grandson)

Phelim Alfred Calleary (3 October 1895 – 4 January 1974) was an Irish Fianna Fáil politician who served as a Teachta Dála (TD) for Mayo North constituency from 1952 to 1969.

== Revolutionary period ==
Calleary joined the Irish Volunteers in 1914 and was attached to 1 Battalion, North Mayo Brigade of the Irish Republican Army (IRA) during the Irish War of Independence. He took part in several raids and ambushes of British forces before transferring to Cavan Town Battalion of the IRA in 1920.

Returning to County Mayo, Calleary took the anti-Treaty side in the Irish Civil War and had engagements against National Army in County Mayo and County Sligo. He managed to evade arrest/capture and remained 'on the run' until 1924. Calleary was later awarded a pension by the Irish government under the Military Service Pensions Act, 1934 for his service with the Irish Volunteers and the IRA.

== Politics ==
He was elected as a Fianna Fáil TD for the Mayo North constituency at the June 1952 by-election, caused by the death of P. J. Ruttledge. He was re-elected at each subsequent general election until retiring at the 1969 general election.

His son Seán Calleary was a Fianna Fáil TD for Mayo East from 1973 to 1992 and served as a Minister of State in a number of government departments. His grandson Dara Calleary was elected as a Fianna Fáil TD for the Mayo constituency at the 2007 general election.

== See also ==
- Families in the Oireachtas

Dáil	Election	Deputy (Party)	Deputy (Party)	Deputy (Party)	Deputy (Party)
4th	1923	P. J. Ruttledge (Rep)	Henry Coyle (CnaG)	John Crowley (Rep)	Joseph McGrath (CnaG)
4th	1924 by-election	P. J. Ruttledge (Rep)	John Madden (Rep)	John Crowley (Rep)	Joseph McGrath (CnaG)
4th	1925 by-election	P. J. Ruttledge (Rep)	John Madden (Rep)	John Crowley (Rep)	Michael Tierney (CnaG)
5th	1927 (Jun)	P. J. Ruttledge (FF)	John Madden (SF)	Michael Davis (CnaG)	Mark Henry (CnaG)
6th	1927 (Sep)	P. J. Ruttledge (FF)	Micheál Clery (FF)	Michael Davis (CnaG)	Mark Henry (CnaG)
7th	1932	P. J. Ruttledge (FF)	Micheál Clery (FF)	Michael Davis (CnaG)	Patrick O'Hara (CnaG)
8th	1933	P. J. Ruttledge (FF)	Micheál Clery (FF)	Michael Davis (CnaG)	James Morrisroe (CnaG)
9th	1937	P. J. Ruttledge (FF)	John Munnelly (FF)	Patrick Browne (FG)	3 seats 1937–1969
10th	1938	P. J. Ruttledge (FF)	John Munnelly (FF)	Patrick Browne (FG)	3 seats 1937–1969
11th	1943	P. J. Ruttledge (FF)	James Kilroy (FF)	Patrick Browne (FG)	3 seats 1937–1969
12th	1944	P. J. Ruttledge (FF)	James Kilroy (FF)	Patrick Browne (FG)	3 seats 1937–1969
13th	1948	P. J. Ruttledge (FF)	James Kilroy (FF)	Patrick Browne (FG)	3 seats 1937–1969
14th	1951	P. J. Ruttledge (FF)	Thomas O'Hara (CnaT)	Patrick Browne (FG)	3 seats 1937–1969
14th	1952 by-election	Phelim Calleary (FF)	Thomas O'Hara (CnaT)	Patrick Browne (FG)	3 seats 1937–1969
15th	1954	Phelim Calleary (FF)	Thomas O'Hara (CnaT)	Patrick Lindsay (FG)	3 seats 1937–1969
16th	1957	Phelim Calleary (FF)	Seán Doherty (FF)	Patrick Lindsay (FG)	3 seats 1937–1969
17th	1961	Phelim Calleary (FF)	Joseph Lenehan (Ind.)	Michael Browne (FG)	3 seats 1937–1969
18th	1965	Phelim Calleary (FF)	Patrick Lindsay (FG)	Thomas O'Hara (FG)	3 seats 1937–1969
19th	1969	Constituency abolished. See Mayo East and Mayo West			
