= James Kilroy (politician) =

Irish politician (1890–1954)

Senator
- In office 14 August 1951 – 5 January 1954
- Constituency: Agricultural Panel

Teachta Dála
- In office June 1943 – May 1951
- Constituency: Mayo North

Personal details
- Born: 1890 County Mayo, Ireland
- Died: 5 January 1954 (aged 63–64)
- Party: Fianna Fáil

James Kilroy (1890 – 5 January 1954) was an Irish Fianna Fáil politician and farmer.

In his earlier life Kilroy was a District councillor for the Belmullet area and a member of the Belmullet Board of Guardians representing Sinn Féin. He was also Captain of the Ballyglass Company of the Irish Volunteers and later Adjutant of the 7th Battalion Belmullet and was captured after the burning of the Ballyglass Coast Guard Station in August 1920. He was interned in Galway, and in Portland and Dartmoor until January 1922. He took the Anti-Treaty side in the subsequent Irish Civil War and was a member of the 5th Brigade of the 4th Western Division comprising Erris and Achill and North West Mayo. He was captured near Westport in November 1922 while serving with a Flying Column there and was interned in Harepark camp until 1924.

After his release, he was an active member in Belmullet in the formation of the Fianna Fáil and was elected to Mayo County Council for Belmullet electoral area in 1927. He was elected to Dáil Éireann as a Teachta Dála (TD) for the Mayo North constituency at the 1943 general election, and was re-elected at the 1944 and 1948 general elections. He lost his Dáil seat at the 1951 general election but at the subsequent 1951 Seanad Éireann election, he was elected for the Agricultural Panel.

Dáil	Election	Deputy (Party)	Deputy (Party)	Deputy (Party)	Deputy (Party)
4th	1923	P. J. Ruttledge (Rep)	Henry Coyle (CnaG)	John Crowley (Rep)	Joseph McGrath (CnaG)
4th	1924 by-election	P. J. Ruttledge (Rep)	John Madden (Rep)	John Crowley (Rep)	Joseph McGrath (CnaG)
4th	1925 by-election	P. J. Ruttledge (Rep)	John Madden (Rep)	John Crowley (Rep)	Michael Tierney (CnaG)
5th	1927 (Jun)	P. J. Ruttledge (FF)	John Madden (SF)	Michael Davis (CnaG)	Mark Henry (CnaG)
6th	1927 (Sep)	P. J. Ruttledge (FF)	Micheál Clery (FF)	Michael Davis (CnaG)	Mark Henry (CnaG)
7th	1932	P. J. Ruttledge (FF)	Micheál Clery (FF)	Michael Davis (CnaG)	Patrick O'Hara (CnaG)
8th	1933	P. J. Ruttledge (FF)	Micheál Clery (FF)	Michael Davis (CnaG)	James Morrisroe (CnaG)
9th	1937	P. J. Ruttledge (FF)	John Munnelly (FF)	Patrick Browne (FG)	3 seats 1937–1969
10th	1938	P. J. Ruttledge (FF)	John Munnelly (FF)	Patrick Browne (FG)	3 seats 1937–1969
11th	1943	P. J. Ruttledge (FF)	James Kilroy (FF)	Patrick Browne (FG)	3 seats 1937–1969
12th	1944	P. J. Ruttledge (FF)	James Kilroy (FF)	Patrick Browne (FG)	3 seats 1937–1969
13th	1948	P. J. Ruttledge (FF)	James Kilroy (FF)	Patrick Browne (FG)	3 seats 1937–1969
14th	1951	P. J. Ruttledge (FF)	Thomas O'Hara (CnaT)	Patrick Browne (FG)	3 seats 1937–1969
14th	1952 by-election	Phelim Calleary (FF)	Thomas O'Hara (CnaT)	Patrick Browne (FG)	3 seats 1937–1969
15th	1954	Phelim Calleary (FF)	Thomas O'Hara (CnaT)	Patrick Lindsay (FG)	3 seats 1937–1969
16th	1957	Phelim Calleary (FF)	Seán Doherty (FF)	Patrick Lindsay (FG)	3 seats 1937–1969
17th	1961	Phelim Calleary (FF)	Joseph Lenehan (Ind.)	Michael Browne (FG)	3 seats 1937–1969
18th	1965	Phelim Calleary (FF)	Patrick Lindsay (FG)	Thomas O'Hara (FG)	3 seats 1937–1969
19th	1969	Constituency abolished. See Mayo East and Mayo West			
