= Michael Tierney (politician) =

Irish politician and academic (1894–1975)

- Tierney in 1954

Seanad Éireann
- In office 27 April 1938 – 18 August 1944
- Constituency: National University

Teachta Dála
- In office September 1927 – February 1932
- Constituency: National University
- In office March 1925 – June 1927
- Constituency: Mayo North

Personal details
- Born: 30 September 1894 Castleblakeney, County Galway, Ireland
- Died: 10 May 1975 (aged 80) Dublin, Ireland
- Party: Fine Gael
- Other political affiliations: Cumann na nGaedheal; Blueshirts
- Spouse: Eibhlín MacNeill
- Children: 7
- Relatives: Eoin MacNeill (father-in-law)
- Education: University College Dublin

Michael Tierney (30 September 1894 – 10 May 1975) was Professor of Greek at University College Dublin (UCD) from 1923 to 1947 and President of UCD between 1947 and 1964, and was also a Cumann na nGaedheal (and later Fine Gael) politician.

== Biography ==
Tierney was born in 1894 in the townland of Esker, near Castleblakeney, County Galway, the son of Michael Tierney, a farmer, and Bridget Finn. He attended St Joseph's College, Ballinasloe, and entered UCD in October 1911. He graduated in 1914 with a first-class honours degree in Ancient Classics. Two years later he was awarded his MA degree, and he worked as an assistant lecturer in Greek from 1918 to 1919 and 1920 to 1922. In 1917 he won a National University of Ireland (NUI) travelling studentship in Classics and used it to study in the Sorbonne, British School at Athens and Berlin from 1919 to 1921. He was appointed to the Chair of Greek in 1922.

Tierney was contested the 1924 Mayo North by-election for Cumann na nGaedheal, but was defeated. He was elected as a Teachta Dála (TD) for at the 1925 Mayo North by-election. At the September 1927 general election, he was elected for the NUI in 1927, a seat he held until his defeat at the 1932 general election.

Tierney came to corporatism through a study of Catholic social thought, and through an analysis of continental systems of corporatism, particularly those of Portugal and Austria. He was an early member of the Army Comrades Association (later known as the Blueshirts) and, along with Ernest Blythe, encouraged Eoin O'Duffy to become the leader. Tierney suggested the name "Fine Gael" for a merger between his party, the Centre Party and the Blueshirts.

He was a member of Seanad Éireann from 1938 to 1944. He was the prime mover behind the transfer of UCD to its site at Belfield.

On 28 June 1923, he married Eibhlín MacNeill, daughter of Eoin MacNeill; they had five sons and two daughters. He wrote a biography of his father-in-law, Eoin MacNeill: scholar and man of action (1980).

Academic offices
Preceded by Arthur W. Conway	President of the University College Dublin; 1947–1964	Succeeded by Jeremiah Hogan

Dáil	Election	Deputy (Party)	Deputy (Party)	Deputy (Party)	Deputy (Party)
4th	1923	P. J. Ruttledge (Rep)	Henry Coyle (CnaG)	John Crowley (Rep)	Joseph McGrath (CnaG)
4th	1924 by-election	P. J. Ruttledge (Rep)	John Madden (Rep)	John Crowley (Rep)	Joseph McGrath (CnaG)
4th	1925 by-election	P. J. Ruttledge (Rep)	John Madden (Rep)	John Crowley (Rep)	Michael Tierney (CnaG)
5th	1927 (Jun)	P. J. Ruttledge (FF)	John Madden (SF)	Michael Davis (CnaG)	Mark Henry (CnaG)
6th	1927 (Sep)	P. J. Ruttledge (FF)	Micheál Clery (FF)	Michael Davis (CnaG)	Mark Henry (CnaG)
7th	1932	P. J. Ruttledge (FF)	Micheál Clery (FF)	Michael Davis (CnaG)	Patrick O'Hara (CnaG)
8th	1933	P. J. Ruttledge (FF)	Micheál Clery (FF)	Michael Davis (CnaG)	James Morrisroe (CnaG)
9th	1937	P. J. Ruttledge (FF)	John Munnelly (FF)	Patrick Browne (FG)	3 seats 1937–1969
10th	1938	P. J. Ruttledge (FF)	John Munnelly (FF)	Patrick Browne (FG)	3 seats 1937–1969
11th	1943	P. J. Ruttledge (FF)	James Kilroy (FF)	Patrick Browne (FG)	3 seats 1937–1969
12th	1944	P. J. Ruttledge (FF)	James Kilroy (FF)	Patrick Browne (FG)	3 seats 1937–1969
13th	1948	P. J. Ruttledge (FF)	James Kilroy (FF)	Patrick Browne (FG)	3 seats 1937–1969
14th	1951	P. J. Ruttledge (FF)	Thomas O'Hara (CnaT)	Patrick Browne (FG)	3 seats 1937–1969
14th	1952 by-election	Phelim Calleary (FF)	Thomas O'Hara (CnaT)	Patrick Browne (FG)	3 seats 1937–1969
15th	1954	Phelim Calleary (FF)	Thomas O'Hara (CnaT)	Patrick Lindsay (FG)	3 seats 1937–1969
16th	1957	Phelim Calleary (FF)	Seán Doherty (FF)	Patrick Lindsay (FG)	3 seats 1937–1969
17th	1961	Phelim Calleary (FF)	Joseph Lenehan (Ind.)	Michael Browne (FG)	3 seats 1937–1969
18th	1965	Phelim Calleary (FF)	Patrick Lindsay (FG)	Thomas O'Hara (FG)	3 seats 1937–1969
19th	1969	Constituency abolished. See Mayo East and Mayo West			

Dáil	Election	Deputy (Party)	Deputy (Party)	Deputy (Party)	Deputy (Party)
1st	1918	Eoin MacNeill (SF)	1 seat under 1918 Act		
2nd	1921	Eoin MacNeill (SF)	Ada English (SF)	Michael Hayes (SF)	William Stockley (SF)
3rd	1922	Eoin MacNeill (PT-SF)	William Magennis (Ind.)	Michael Hayes (Note: Michael Hayes served as Ceann Comhairle from 9 September 1922 to 29 January 1932.) (PT-SF)	William Stockley (AT-SF)
4th	1923	Eoin MacNeill (CnaG)	William Magennis (CnaG)	Michael Hayes (CnaG)	3 seats from 1923
4th	1923 by-election	Patrick McGilligan (CnaG)	William Magennis (CnaG)	Michael Hayes (CnaG)	3 seats from 1923
5th	1927 (Jun)	Patrick McGilligan (CnaG)	Arthur Clery (Ind.)	Michael Hayes (CnaG)	3 seats from 1923
6th	1927 (Sep)	Patrick McGilligan (CnaG)	Michael Tierney (CnaG)	Michael Hayes (CnaG)	3 seats from 1923
7th	1932	Patrick McGilligan (CnaG)	Conor Maguire (FF)	Michael Hayes (CnaG)	3 seats from 1923
8th	1933	Patrick McGilligan (CnaG)	Conor Maguire (FF)	Helena Concannon (FF)	3 seats from 1923
8th	1936	Patrick McGilligan (CnaG)	(Vacant)	Helena Concannon (FF)	3 seats from 1923
