= Jeremiah Hogan =

Irish academic (1902–1982)

Jeremiah Joseph Hogan (1902–1982) was an Irish academic, who served as president of University College Dublin from 1964 to 1972 the fourth president of the university since the creation of the NUI.

Born in Dame Street in Dublin on 21 April 1902, Hogan was educated at the Catholic University School, and went to UCD. He gained a BA in 1922 and MA in 1923 gaining University Travelling Studentship in Modern Languages. He studied English Language and Literature at Oxford University, graduating in 1927 with a B.Litt. He was appointed professor of English literature in UCD in 1934 and chair of English in 1945. He served Dean of Arts from 1947 and as Registrar from 1953. Professor Hogans tenure as president of UCD, seen the development of the Belfield campus.

In 1968 Hogan was awarded an Honorary D.Litt. by the National University of Ireland.

He died on 10 July 1982 and is buried in Deansgrange Cemetery.

Academic offices
Preceded by Michael Tierney	President of the University College Dublin; 1964–1972	Succeeded by Thomas Murphy
Preceded by	Registrar of University College Dublin; 1953–1964	Succeeded by Thomas Murphy
