= John Madden (Irish politician) =

Irish politician (c.1895–1954)

Teachta Dála
- In office November 1924 – September 1927
- Constituency: Mayo North

Personal details
- Born: c. 1896
- Died: 1954 (aged 57–58)
- Party: Sinn Féin

John Anthony Madden (c. 1896 – 1954) was an Irish politician and medical practitioner. He was first elected to Dáil Éireann as a Sinn Féin Teachta Dála (TD) for the Mayo North constituency at the November 1924 by-election caused by the disqualification of Cumann na nGaedheal's Henry Coyle, who was imprisoned for bouncing cheques.

Madden was re-elected at the June 1927 general election but did not take his seat in either Dáil due to Sinn Féin's abstentionist policy. He did not contest the September 1927 general election.

Party political offices
Preceded by P. J. Ruttledge	Vice President of Sinn Féin; 1927–1933; With: Mary MacSwiney	Succeeded by Margaret Buckley

Dáil	Election	Deputy (Party)	Deputy (Party)	Deputy (Party)	Deputy (Party)
4th	1923	P. J. Ruttledge (Rep)	Henry Coyle (CnaG)	John Crowley (Rep)	Joseph McGrath (CnaG)
4th	1924 by-election	P. J. Ruttledge (Rep)	John Madden (Rep)	John Crowley (Rep)	Joseph McGrath (CnaG)
4th	1925 by-election	P. J. Ruttledge (Rep)	John Madden (Rep)	John Crowley (Rep)	Michael Tierney (CnaG)
5th	1927 (Jun)	P. J. Ruttledge (FF)	John Madden (SF)	Michael Davis (CnaG)	Mark Henry (CnaG)
6th	1927 (Sep)	P. J. Ruttledge (FF)	Micheál Clery (FF)	Michael Davis (CnaG)	Mark Henry (CnaG)
7th	1932	P. J. Ruttledge (FF)	Micheál Clery (FF)	Michael Davis (CnaG)	Patrick O'Hara (CnaG)
8th	1933	P. J. Ruttledge (FF)	Micheál Clery (FF)	Michael Davis (CnaG)	James Morrisroe (CnaG)
9th	1937	P. J. Ruttledge (FF)	John Munnelly (FF)	Patrick Browne (FG)	3 seats 1937–1969
10th	1938	P. J. Ruttledge (FF)	John Munnelly (FF)	Patrick Browne (FG)	3 seats 1937–1969
11th	1943	P. J. Ruttledge (FF)	James Kilroy (FF)	Patrick Browne (FG)	3 seats 1937–1969
12th	1944	P. J. Ruttledge (FF)	James Kilroy (FF)	Patrick Browne (FG)	3 seats 1937–1969
13th	1948	P. J. Ruttledge (FF)	James Kilroy (FF)	Patrick Browne (FG)	3 seats 1937–1969
14th	1951	P. J. Ruttledge (FF)	Thomas O'Hara (CnaT)	Patrick Browne (FG)	3 seats 1937–1969
14th	1952 by-election	Phelim Calleary (FF)	Thomas O'Hara (CnaT)	Patrick Browne (FG)	3 seats 1937–1969
15th	1954	Phelim Calleary (FF)	Thomas O'Hara (CnaT)	Patrick Lindsay (FG)	3 seats 1937–1969
16th	1957	Phelim Calleary (FF)	Seán Doherty (FF)	Patrick Lindsay (FG)	3 seats 1937–1969
17th	1961	Phelim Calleary (FF)	Joseph Lenehan (Ind.)	Michael Browne (FG)	3 seats 1937–1969
18th	1965	Phelim Calleary (FF)	Patrick Lindsay (FG)	Thomas O'Hara (FG)	3 seats 1937–1969
19th	1969	Constituency abolished. See Mayo East and Mayo West			
