= James Morrisroe =

Teachta Dála
- In office January 1933 – July 1937
- Constituency: Mayo North

Personal details
- Born: 5 April 1875 County Mayo, Ireland
- Died: 31 December 1937 (aged 62)
- Party: Cumann na nGaedheal

James Morrisroe (5 April 1875 – 31 December 1937) was an Irish politician from Charlestown, County Mayo. He was elected to Dáil Éireann as a Cumann na nGaedheal Teachta Dála (TD) for the Mayo North constituency at the 1933 general election. Morrisroe held the seat for one Dáil session, until he was defeated at the 1937 general election. Morrisroe also served on the Swinford Board of Guardians and the Swinford District Council. His brother, Patrick Morrisroe, served as the Bishop of Achonry.

Dáil	Election	Deputy (Party)	Deputy (Party)	Deputy (Party)	Deputy (Party)
4th	1923	P. J. Ruttledge (Rep)	Henry Coyle (CnaG)	John Crowley (Rep)	Joseph McGrath (CnaG)
4th	1924 by-election	P. J. Ruttledge (Rep)	John Madden (Rep)	John Crowley (Rep)	Joseph McGrath (CnaG)
4th	1925 by-election	P. J. Ruttledge (Rep)	John Madden (Rep)	John Crowley (Rep)	Michael Tierney (CnaG)
5th	1927 (Jun)	P. J. Ruttledge (FF)	John Madden (SF)	Michael Davis (CnaG)	Mark Henry (CnaG)
6th	1927 (Sep)	P. J. Ruttledge (FF)	Micheál Clery (FF)	Michael Davis (CnaG)	Mark Henry (CnaG)
7th	1932	P. J. Ruttledge (FF)	Micheál Clery (FF)	Michael Davis (CnaG)	Patrick O'Hara (CnaG)
8th	1933	P. J. Ruttledge (FF)	Micheál Clery (FF)	Michael Davis (CnaG)	James Morrisroe (CnaG)
9th	1937	P. J. Ruttledge (FF)	John Munnelly (FF)	Patrick Browne (FG)	3 seats 1937–1969
10th	1938	P. J. Ruttledge (FF)	John Munnelly (FF)	Patrick Browne (FG)	3 seats 1937–1969
11th	1943	P. J. Ruttledge (FF)	James Kilroy (FF)	Patrick Browne (FG)	3 seats 1937–1969
12th	1944	P. J. Ruttledge (FF)	James Kilroy (FF)	Patrick Browne (FG)	3 seats 1937–1969
13th	1948	P. J. Ruttledge (FF)	James Kilroy (FF)	Patrick Browne (FG)	3 seats 1937–1969
14th	1951	P. J. Ruttledge (FF)	Thomas O'Hara (CnaT)	Patrick Browne (FG)	3 seats 1937–1969
14th	1952 by-election	Phelim Calleary (FF)	Thomas O'Hara (CnaT)	Patrick Browne (FG)	3 seats 1937–1969
15th	1954	Phelim Calleary (FF)	Thomas O'Hara (CnaT)	Patrick Lindsay (FG)	3 seats 1937–1969
16th	1957	Phelim Calleary (FF)	Seán Doherty (FF)	Patrick Lindsay (FG)	3 seats 1937–1969
17th	1961	Phelim Calleary (FF)	Joseph Lenehan (Ind.)	Michael Browne (FG)	3 seats 1937–1969
18th	1965	Phelim Calleary (FF)	Patrick Lindsay (FG)	Thomas O'Hara (FG)	3 seats 1937–1969
19th	1969	Constituency abolished. See Mayo East and Mayo West			
