= John Munnelly =

Irish politician (died 1941)

Teachta Dála
- In office July 1937 – 18 October 1941
- Constituency: Mayo North

Personal details
- Born: County Mayo, Ireland
- Died: 18 October 1941 County Mayo, Ireland
- Party: Fianna Fáil

John Munnelly (died 18 October 1941) was an Irish Fianna Fáil politician. A farmer, he was a county councillor before being elected, on his fourth attempt, to Dáil Éireann as a Fianna Fáil Teachta Dála (TD) for the Mayo North constituency at the 1937 general election. He was re-elected at the 1938 general election. He died in office in October 1941 but no by-election was held for his seat.

Dáil	Election	Deputy (Party)	Deputy (Party)	Deputy (Party)	Deputy (Party)
4th	1923	P. J. Ruttledge (Rep)	Henry Coyle (CnaG)	John Crowley (Rep)	Joseph McGrath (CnaG)
4th	1924 by-election	P. J. Ruttledge (Rep)	John Madden (Rep)	John Crowley (Rep)	Joseph McGrath (CnaG)
4th	1925 by-election	P. J. Ruttledge (Rep)	John Madden (Rep)	John Crowley (Rep)	Michael Tierney (CnaG)
5th	1927 (Jun)	P. J. Ruttledge (FF)	John Madden (SF)	Michael Davis (CnaG)	Mark Henry (CnaG)
6th	1927 (Sep)	P. J. Ruttledge (FF)	Micheál Clery (FF)	Michael Davis (CnaG)	Mark Henry (CnaG)
7th	1932	P. J. Ruttledge (FF)	Micheál Clery (FF)	Michael Davis (CnaG)	Patrick O'Hara (CnaG)
8th	1933	P. J. Ruttledge (FF)	Micheál Clery (FF)	Michael Davis (CnaG)	James Morrisroe (CnaG)
9th	1937	P. J. Ruttledge (FF)	John Munnelly (FF)	Patrick Browne (FG)	3 seats 1937–1969
10th	1938	P. J. Ruttledge (FF)	John Munnelly (FF)	Patrick Browne (FG)	3 seats 1937–1969
11th	1943	P. J. Ruttledge (FF)	James Kilroy (FF)	Patrick Browne (FG)	3 seats 1937–1969
12th	1944	P. J. Ruttledge (FF)	James Kilroy (FF)	Patrick Browne (FG)	3 seats 1937–1969
13th	1948	P. J. Ruttledge (FF)	James Kilroy (FF)	Patrick Browne (FG)	3 seats 1937–1969
14th	1951	P. J. Ruttledge (FF)	Thomas O'Hara (CnaT)	Patrick Browne (FG)	3 seats 1937–1969
14th	1952 by-election	Phelim Calleary (FF)	Thomas O'Hara (CnaT)	Patrick Browne (FG)	3 seats 1937–1969
15th	1954	Phelim Calleary (FF)	Thomas O'Hara (CnaT)	Patrick Lindsay (FG)	3 seats 1937–1969
16th	1957	Phelim Calleary (FF)	Seán Doherty (FF)	Patrick Lindsay (FG)	3 seats 1937–1969
17th	1961	Phelim Calleary (FF)	Joseph Lenehan (Ind.)	Michael Browne (FG)	3 seats 1937–1969
18th	1965	Phelim Calleary (FF)	Patrick Lindsay (FG)	Thomas O'Hara (FG)	3 seats 1937–1969
19th	1969	Constituency abolished. See Mayo East and Mayo West			
