= Patrick Lindsay (Irish politician) =

Irish politician (1914–1993)

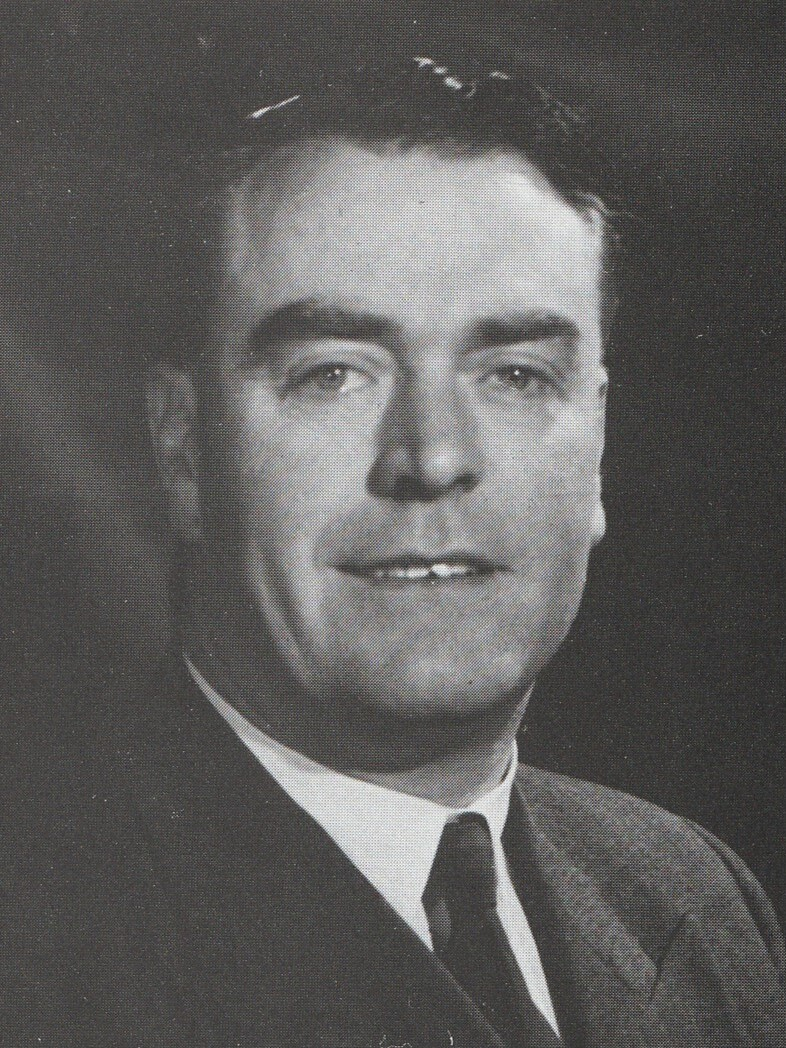
- Lindsay in 1954

Minister for the Gaeltacht
- In office 24 October 1956 – 20 March 1957
- Taoiseach: John A. Costello
- Preceded by: Richard Mulcahy
- Succeeded by: Jack Lynch

Parliamentary Secretary
- 1956: Gaeltacht
- 1956: Education

Teachta Dála
- In office April 1965 – June 1969
- In office May 1954 – October 1961
- Constituency: Mayo North

Senator
- In office 14 December 1961 – 7 April 1965
- Constituency: Industrial and Commercial Panel

Personal details
- Born: 18 January 1914 Dublin, Ireland
- Died: 29 June 1993 (aged 79) Connemara, County Galway, Ireland
- Party: Fine Gael
- Spouse: Moya Brady (m. 1952)
- Children: 3
- Education: University College Galway

Patrick James Lindsay (18 January 1914 – 29 June 1993) was an Irish politician and lawyer.

== Early life ==
He was born in 1914 in the Rotunda Hospital, Dublin, the eldest of three sons and four daughters of Patrick Lindsay, post office worker, and his wife Mary (née Keegan). Before his second birthday, the family returned to their native County Mayo, settling in the village of Doolough, Kiltane parish, Erris. He received his primary education at Gweesalia national school, and attended secondary school at St. Muiredach's College, Ballina. He subsequently attended University College Galway, where he studied ancient classics, between 1933 and 1937, graduating with an M.A. He was a noted figure in the college – a gifted orator, he served on the committee of the Literary and Debating Society, and took part in the productions of the Drama Society. He was also a member of the Blueshirts movement while in college. He was only just dissuaded by his classics professor at the last moment from embarking with the Irish Brigade under Eoin O'Duffy to fight for Franco in the Spanish Civil War.

It was while I was at UCG that the movement known as the Blueshirts came into existence. I’ve said it before and I say it again here, I am an unrepentant Blueshirt.

— Memories

However, while Lindsay declared himself as being "an unrepentant" Blueshirt, in his autobiography he denied that himself or many of the membership saw themselves as actual Fascists. Rather that they viewed themselves as a pseudo-paramilitary wing of Cumann na nGaedheal that was a response to the IRA of the 1930s acting as a pseudo-paramilitary wing of Fianna Fáil, and in fact, that they saw themselves as Democrats upholding free speech.

As for the charge of Fascism- that's total nonsense. Most of us did not know what it is and had we known we would have been totally opposed to it. We felt, indeed we still feel, that our democratic credentials were impeccable. We had defended the State, democratically established in the past against the all that could be thrown against it during the civil war and we are not going to change now.

— Memories, page 54

Lindsay subsequently became a teacher of classics at the Royal School, Cavan, and later at schools in Dublin. He studied law at University College Dublin and the King's Inns, and was called to the Irish Bar in 1946. He married Moya Brady in 1952, and they had three children.

== Politics ==
He was elected to Dáil Éireann on his sixth attempt, at the 1954 general election as a Fine Gael Teachta Dála (TD) for Mayo North. He was re-elected at the 1957 general election, but lost his seat at the 1961 general election, after which he was elected to the 10th Seanad by the Industrial and Commercial Panel. He became Leas-Chathaoirleach of the Seanad.

Lindsay returned to the Dáil at the 1965 general election, but lost his seat at the 1969 general election, when he switched constituency to Dublin North-Central. He was again unsuccessful at the 1973 general election.

His ministerial career was brief, lasting only eight months. In July 1956, he was appointed by Taoiseach John A. Costello as Parliamentary Secretary to the Minister for the Gaeltacht and to the Minister for Education in the Second Inter-Party Government. In October 1956, he was promoted to the cabinet as Minister for the Gaeltacht, serving until March 1957, when Fianna Fáil returned to power after the 1957 general election. On his return to the Dáil in 1965, he was appointed Fine Gael spokesman on transport and power.

== Law ==
Lindsay had become a Senior Counsel in 1954, and following the loss of his parliamentary seat in 1969, he devoted himself full-time to his practice at the bar, becoming a leading figure in criminal law. In 1975, he was appointed to the position of Master of the High Court, from which he retired on his seventieth birthday in January 1984.

== Later life ==
Lindsay served as chair of Cumann Céimithe na Gaillimhe, the University College Galway Graduate Association, during the 1980s. He published his memoirs in 1992. He died on 29 June 1993.

== Sources ==
- Obituary, The Irish Times, 30 June 1993.

Political offices
New office	Parliamentary Secretary to the Minister for the Gaeltacht; Jul.–Oct. 1956	Office abolished
New office	Parliamentary Secretary to the Minister for Education; Jul.–Oct. 1956	Office abolished
Preceded by Richard Mulcahy	Minister for the Gaeltacht; 1956–1957	Succeeded by Jack Lynch

Dáil	Election	Deputy (Party)	Deputy (Party)	Deputy (Party)	Deputy (Party)
4th	1923	P. J. Ruttledge (Rep)	Henry Coyle (CnaG)	John Crowley (Rep)	Joseph McGrath (CnaG)
4th	1924 by-election	P. J. Ruttledge (Rep)	John Madden (Rep)	John Crowley (Rep)	Joseph McGrath (CnaG)
4th	1925 by-election	P. J. Ruttledge (Rep)	John Madden (Rep)	John Crowley (Rep)	Michael Tierney (CnaG)
5th	1927 (Jun)	P. J. Ruttledge (FF)	John Madden (SF)	Michael Davis (CnaG)	Mark Henry (CnaG)
6th	1927 (Sep)	P. J. Ruttledge (FF)	Micheál Clery (FF)	Michael Davis (CnaG)	Mark Henry (CnaG)
7th	1932	P. J. Ruttledge (FF)	Micheál Clery (FF)	Michael Davis (CnaG)	Patrick O'Hara (CnaG)
8th	1933	P. J. Ruttledge (FF)	Micheál Clery (FF)	Michael Davis (CnaG)	James Morrisroe (CnaG)
9th	1937	P. J. Ruttledge (FF)	John Munnelly (FF)	Patrick Browne (FG)	3 seats 1937–1969
10th	1938	P. J. Ruttledge (FF)	John Munnelly (FF)	Patrick Browne (FG)	3 seats 1937–1969
11th	1943	P. J. Ruttledge (FF)	James Kilroy (FF)	Patrick Browne (FG)	3 seats 1937–1969
12th	1944	P. J. Ruttledge (FF)	James Kilroy (FF)	Patrick Browne (FG)	3 seats 1937–1969
13th	1948	P. J. Ruttledge (FF)	James Kilroy (FF)	Patrick Browne (FG)	3 seats 1937–1969
14th	1951	P. J. Ruttledge (FF)	Thomas O'Hara (CnaT)	Patrick Browne (FG)	3 seats 1937–1969
14th	1952 by-election	Phelim Calleary (FF)	Thomas O'Hara (CnaT)	Patrick Browne (FG)	3 seats 1937–1969
15th	1954	Phelim Calleary (FF)	Thomas O'Hara (CnaT)	Patrick Lindsay (FG)	3 seats 1937–1969
16th	1957	Phelim Calleary (FF)	Seán Doherty (FF)	Patrick Lindsay (FG)	3 seats 1937–1969
17th	1961	Phelim Calleary (FF)	Joseph Lenehan (Ind.)	Michael Browne (FG)	3 seats 1937–1969
18th	1965	Phelim Calleary (FF)	Patrick Lindsay (FG)	Thomas O'Hara (FG)	3 seats 1937–1969
19th	1969	Constituency abolished. See Mayo East and Mayo West			
