= 1937 Irish general election =

Election to the 9th Dáil

- 1 July 1937

138 seats in Dáil Éireann (Note: Including Frank Fahy, returned automatically for Galway East as outgoing Ceann Comhairle, under Art. 21 of the Constitution, as amended by the Constitution (Amendment No. 2) Act 1927, and s. 2 of the Electoral (Amendment) Act 1927, adapted under the constituency revision.) 70 seats needed for a majority
- Turnout: 76.2% ▼5.1 pp
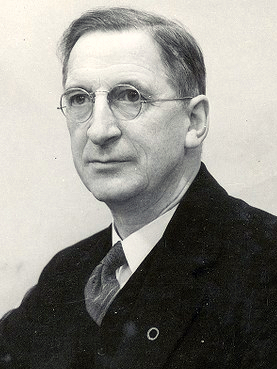

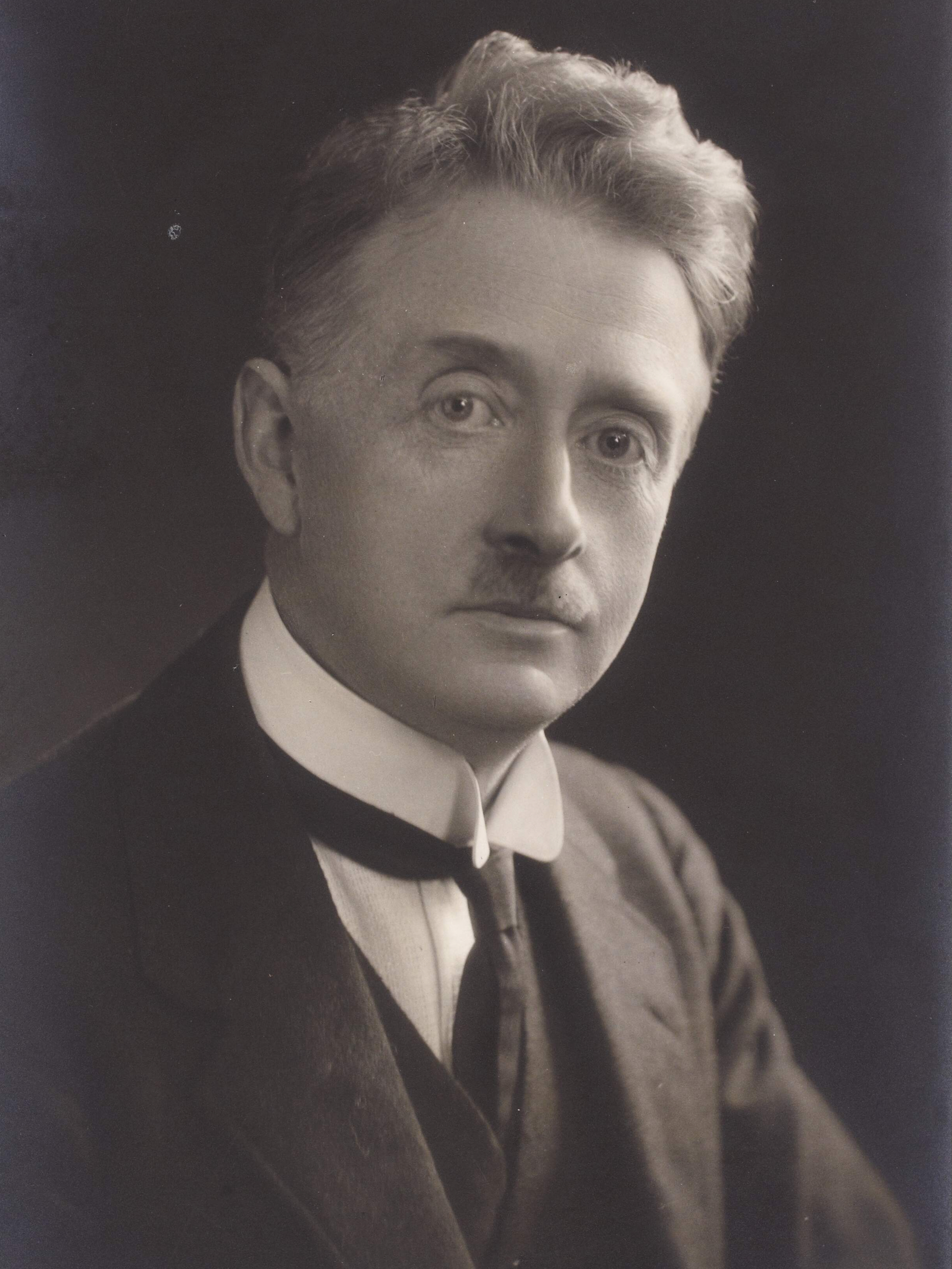

	First party	Second party	Third party
Leader	Éamon de Valera	W. T. Cosgrave	William Norton
Party	Fianna Fáil	Fine Gael	Labour
Leader since	26 March 1926	September 1934	26 February 1932
Leader's seat	Clare	Cork Borough	Carlow–Kildare
Last election	77 seats, 49.7%	59 seats, 39.6% (Note: The total number of Fine Gael TDs is compared to the combined total won by Cumann na nGaedheal and the National Centre Party at the previous general election.)	8 seats, 5.7%
Seats won	69	48	13
Seat change	▼8	▼11	▲5
Popular vote	599,040	461,171	135,758
Percentage	45.2%	34.8%	10.3%
Swing	▼4.5 pp	▼4.8 pp	▲4.6 pp
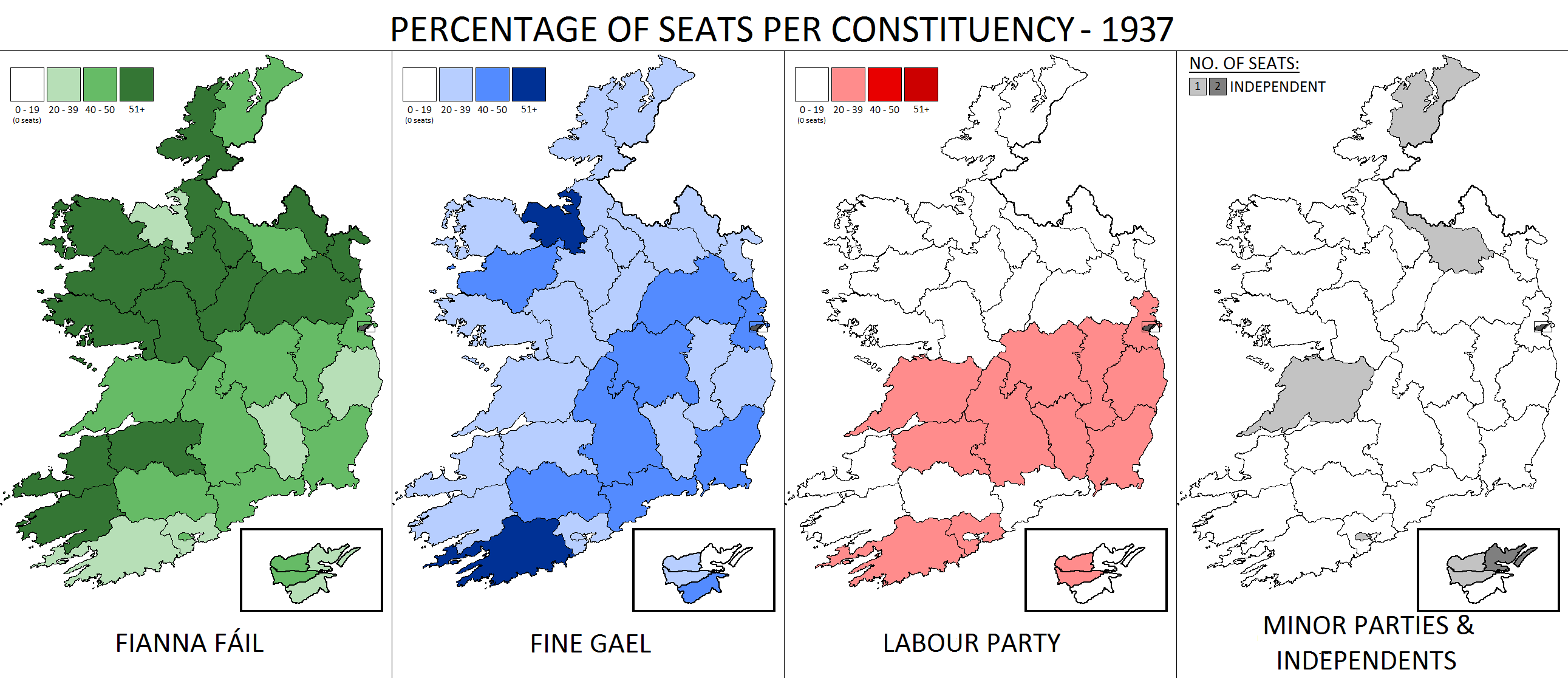
President of the Executive Council before election
Éamon de Valera
Fianna Fáil
President of the Executive Council after election
Éamon de Valera
Fianna Fáil

The 1937 Irish general election to the 9th Dáil was held on Thursday, 1 July, following the dissolution of the 8th Dáil on 14 June by Ceann Comhairle Frank Fahy on the direction of the Executive Council. The general election took place in 34 parliamentary constituencies throughout the Irish Free State for 138 seats in Dáil Éireann. The number of seats in the Dáil was reduced by 15, from 153 to 138 seats, under the Electoral (Revision of Constituencies) Act 1935.

The election took place after five years of Fianna Fáil government. The period was marked by the Economic War with Britain, frequent violence and unrest around the country, the rise and decline of the Blueshirts, the formation of Fine Gael (making its general election debut in this election), sectarian disturbances in 1935, and an intensifying Catholic anti-communist agitation that affected both the far-left and the Labour Party.

A plebiscite on whether to approve the new Constitution of Ireland was held on the same day and was the principal issue of the campaign. It was approved with the support of 56.5% of voters and would come into operation on 29 December 1937.

The 9th Dáil met at Leinster House on 21 July 1937 to elect the President of the Executive Council and approve the appointment of the Executive Council of the Irish Free State. Outgoing president Éamon de Valera was re-elected leading a single-party Fianna Fáil government. On the day the new Constitution took effect, De Valera became Taoiseach, and the Executive Council became a Government with greatly expanded powers.

== Background ==
=== Fianna Fáil in government ===
At the February 1932 general election, Fianna Fáil won 72 seats to 57 for Cumann na nGaedheal, while the Labour Party fell from 22 seats in June 1927 to seven. The historian Mel Farrell has described the peaceful transfer of power, nine years after the Civil War, as an act of great political maturity at a time when Europe was increasingly dominated by dictators. Éamon de Valera formed a minority government with Labour support, after Labour's leader, William Norton, agreed with him an arrangement for cooperation in the Dáil and consultation on policy. According to Olivier Coquelin, Labour was hard to distinguish from Fianna Fáil in its socio-economic aims until 1936.

De Valera called a snap election for 24 January 1933, as Cumann na nGaedheal was negotiating a merger with the National Centre Party. Fianna Fáil won 77 of the 153 seats (including the outgoing Ceann Comhairle), Cumann na nGaedheal 48, the National Centre Party, led by James Dillon and Frank MacDermot, 11, and Labour eight. The Centre Party had grown out of the National Farmers' and Ratepayers' League, formed in October 1932, and its meetings were disrupted by Fianna Fáil and IRA supporters during the campaign. Labour's share of the vote fell to 5.7%. Fianna Fáil continued to govern with Labour support until by-election victories made this unnecessary.

With a firmer majority, the government dismantled much of the 1922 constitutional settlement. The Oath of Allegiance was abolished in 1933, university representation in the Dáil was ended between 1934 and 1936, the Senate was abolished in June 1936, and in December 1936, after the abdication of Edward VIII, references to the monarch were removed from the Constitution. The office of Governor-General was reduced to a very humble status. A role for the Crown in external relations was retained under the Executive Authority (External Relations) Act 1936, which Labour opposed.

=== Economic War ===
The government's decision in 1932 to withhold the land annuities, repayments for loans made to farmers under the land acts, led Britain to impose tariffs on a wide range of Irish agricultural produce, especially live cattle and beef. Ireland retaliated with tariffs on British manufactured goods and raw materials. The resulting Economic War lasted until 1938. As Britain took about 90% of Irish exports, the dispute affected Irish producers more than British consumers. Larger farmers bore the brunt of the restrictions on the livestock trade, while many small farmers were cushioned by new social welfare schemes, and additional jobs were created in new industries by the end of the decade.

The government continued to collect the annuities, sometimes by force, and in September 1934 thirty men were charged before a military tribunal after an attempt to prevent a collection from a farmer in the Kilmallock area. A "coal-cattle pact" in 1934 brought a small improvement in relations, but the tariffs were not removed until a tripartite agreement in April 1938, under which Ireland paid a £10 million lump sum in final settlement of the annuities.

=== Political violence and the Blueshirts ===
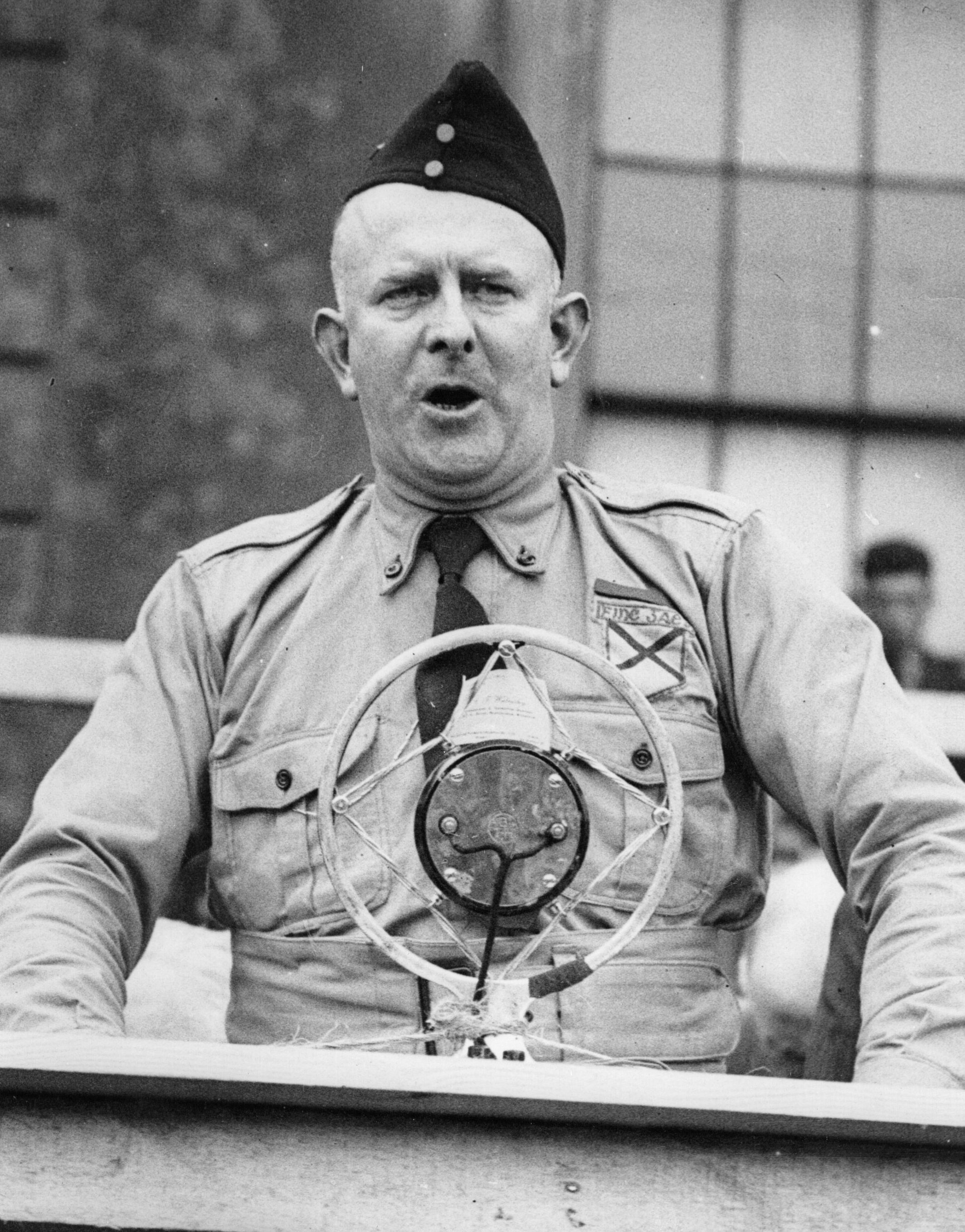
It initially appeared that the fascistic Eoin O'Duffy would lead Fine Gael into the election, but by 1934 he had been removed from power and W. T. Cosgrave returned to the helm

Political meetings were often disrupted in this period. De Valera legalised the Irish Republican Army (IRA) in 1932, and it adopted a policy of "No Free Speech for Traitors", while Cumann na nGaedheal and National Centre Party meetings were attacked by IRA members and militant Fianna Fáil supporters. A Cumann na nGaedheal rally addressed by Richard Mulcahy at Kilmallock on 9 October 1932 ended in a riot in which two shots were fired and property was damaged, and a Cumann na nGaedheal convention in Dublin North in January 1933 was broken up by Fianna Fáil supporters. The Army Comrades Association (ACA), established in early 1932 to uphold the state and protect the interests of former IRA and army members, began to steward opposition meetings and clashed with the IRA. In August 1932 Thomas F. O'Higgins became its leader, joined by the Cumann na nGaedheal TDs Ernest Blythe, Patrick McGilligan and Desmond FitzGerald. The organisation claimed more than 30,000 members by September 1932, although the historian Mike Cronin estimates that the real figure was nearer 8,000.

The ACA adopted the blue shirt as a uniform in March 1933. Eoin O'Duffy, dismissed by de Valera as Garda Commissioner in February 1933, became leader of the Blueshirts in July, renamed them the National Guard and announced a march on Dublin to commemorate figures such as Michael Collins and Arthur Griffith. The government banned the parade on 22 August 1933, fearing a coup, and declared the National Guard illegal after provincial parades took place in defiance of the ban. It also expanded the Garda Special Branch and established military tribunals. De Valera later told Fianna Fáil colleagues that he had been unsure whether the army would obey an order to suppress the Blueshirts, who included many former soldiers. In September 1933 Cumann na nGaedheal, the National Centre Party and the Blueshirts merged to form the United Ireland Party, or Fine Gael, with O'Duffy as its first president and Cosgrave and Dillon as vice-presidents. O'Duffy was chosen in preference to Cosgrave and MacDermot to avoid the impression that the new party was merely a continuation of Cumann na nGaedheal. Norton dismissed it as "an attempt to put old wine in new bottles", and Seán Lemass called the triple alliance the "Cripple Alliance".

The new party fared poorly in its early tests. In March 1934 the Minister for Justice, P. J. Ruttledge, introduced a Wearing of Uniforms (Restriction) Bill to prohibit political uniforms, which was voted down in the Seanad by 30 votes to 18. Labour's leader William Norton, who had denounced the Blueshirts as "Hitlerite", warned in the Dáil debate that the militarisation of politics threatened a return to the violence of the Civil War. The local elections of June 1934 were a trial of strength between Fine Gael and Fianna Fáil. Fine Gael won only six of the 23 local elections, and O'Duffy lost much of his authority and prestige. The Blueshirts peaked in mid-1934 and then disintegrated, and a number of incidents that year, including a campaign against the payment of land annuities, were attributed to them. O'Duffy's erratic behaviour and anti-democratic pronouncements embarrassed his colleagues, and he was forced out in September 1934. Frank MacDermot had protested in July 1934 against Blueshirt speakers who attacked the parliamentary system, and Dillon privately observed in January 1935 that O'Duffy had returned from an interview with Mussolini "definitely fascist". The Blueshirts split between O'Duffy's supporters and those of Ned Cronin, whose larger faction stayed in Fine Gael. O'Duffy attended the Montreux fascist conference in December 1934, founded the National Corporate Party and later raised an Irish Brigade to fight for Franco. The party was led by W. T. Cosgrave by 1937, and Dillon later maintained that the Blueshirts had preserved freedom of speech and assembly. The affairs of the Blueshirts were quietly wound down in October 1936. Fine Gael was widely seen as the successor to Cumann na nGaedheal, but, having been formed in September 1933, after the previous general election, it contested its first general election in 1937.

=== Anti-communism and the left ===
The Church and the state moved against organisations regarded as communist from 1931. In October 1931 the Cosgrave government passed the Public Safety Act, the Catholic bishops issued a joint pastoral letter condemning Saor Éire, and Saor Éire, the IRA and ten other bodies were proscribed. The proscribed bodies included the Revolutionary Workers' Groups, a communist organisation, which the de Valera government unbanned in 1932. The pastoral letter stated that one could not be both a Catholic and a communist. The 1932 Eucharistic Congress in Dublin, a major public display of the Church's standing, is thought by historians to have emboldened the clergy to use their influence over secular society. In 1933 Matthew Cullen, Bishop of Kildare and Leighlin, issued a pastoral letter urging Catholics to be prepared to fight communism, and on 17 March Cardinal Joseph MacRory called in a St Patrick's Day sermon for a united front against those he described as enemies of God.

Between 27 and 30 March 1933, crowds estimated at between 5,000 and 6,000 people laid siege to Connolly House on Great Strand Street, Dublin, the headquarters of the Revolutionary Workers' Groups. The building was ransacked and destroyed on the third night, after a neighbouring building was set on fire, and around twenty people were reportedly injured. The historian R. M. Douglas has described it as the worst violence in Dublin since the Civil War. Other left-wing premises were also attacked, and the riot coincided with a campaign in County Leitrim against the communist James Gralton. Neither the Labour nor the republican leaders condemned the riot, each seeking to avoid being linked to communism, while An Phoblacht blamed "Hitlerists". The riot forced communists underground, and the newly formed Communist Party of Ireland held meetings in June 1933 under the guise of a temperance society.

The left also divided. In March 1934 the IRA rejected a proposal to convene a congress of republican opinion, and its supporters left to found the Republican Congress, which held its founding conference at Athlone in April 1934. It took part in strikes, tenants' campaigns and anti-fascist demonstrations, but split at its first national conference at Rathmines in September 1934 over whether to become a socialist party or a united front. The united front position prevailed by 99 votes to 84. By April 1936 one of its leading figures, Frank Ryan, conceded that the organisation was moribund, and it held no public activities after November 1936. On Easter Sunday, 12 April 1936, part of its contingent in the annual republican parade to Glasnevin Cemetery was attacked by a hostile crowd, and on the following day a joint meeting with the Communist Party at College Green was broken up, and the two organisations' premises were ransacked. Garda reports, cited by historian Donal Fallon, suggested a large and largely middle-class crowd, the vast majority of whom were hostile to the aims of the meeting.

Labour's own move to the left coincided with this climate. At its conference in February 1936, the party adopted a constitution committing it to a "Workers' Republic", which drew a four-year campaign of opposition from right-wing Catholic groups. Coquelin argues that the constitution was drafted mainly to distinguish Labour from Fianna Fáil. Early in 1937 the Vatican newspaper L'Osservatore Romano repeated a claim that trade unionists affiliated to the Irish Trade Union Congress were tacit supporters of communism, and Norton wrote to refute it, after which a retraction was published. Anticipating a general election that year, Labour's leaders sought to avoid anything that clerical or press opponents could exploit, and the party's official newspaper complained of a campaign of slander against it.

The outbreak of the Spanish Civil War in 1936 intensified the anti-communist mood. The Irish Christian Front, established by Patrick Belton in the summer of 1936, campaigned in support of the Spanish Nationalists and against communism in Ireland. Irish newspapers were divided: the Irish Independent presented the war as a struggle between the Catholic faith and Antichrist rather than between fascism and democracy, while The Irish Times backed the elected Republican government of Spain. In a Dáil debate in February 1937, in which Fine Gael pressed the government to recognise Franco's forces, Dillon argued that "the fundamental issue is God or no God". Irish volunteers fought on both sides. More than 650 joined O'Duffy's Irish Brigade on Franco's side, while Ryan led the first contingent of about eighty volunteers for the Republic in December 1936.

=== Sectarian tension and the suppression of the IRA ===
Sectarian tension rose in the summer of 1935. Rioting in Belfast after the Orange Order parades of 12 July left several people dead and drove about 2,000 people, most of them Catholics, from their homes. The violence provoked outrage in the Free State, where it was interpreted as a sectarian attack on the Catholic minority in Northern Ireland. On 20 July a riot in Limerick that began with an arrest drew up to 600 people and turned sectarian, with Protestant-owned properties, including a Baptist church and a Masonic club, attacked, and soldiers were called out to restore order. Reprisals, including arson and threatening graffiti, were reported in at least 19 of the 26 counties, and the government ordered extra Garda protection for Protestant property and denounced the attacks as "un-Irish crimes". A wildcat strike in Galway from 22 to 24 July, led by the Labour politicians and trade union officials William Carrick and John Healy, called for the removal of Orangemen from the city, and was condemned by the Republican Congress and the Communist Party as sectarian agitation.

The government also moved against the IRA, which it had legalised in 1932. According to a review in History Ireland of Brian Hanley's study of the period, the IRA had played a key role in Fianna Fáil's election in 1932 but gained no real influence, and the government's step-by-step removal of British links narrowed the ground on which the IRA could operate, so that by 1936 de Valera was on a collision course with it. After the killings of Vice-Admiral Boyle Somerville in Cork and John Egan in Waterford, the government outlawed the IRA in June 1936 and banned its annual commemoration at Bodenstown, and members appeared in daily batches before a military tribunal, receiving sentences of between six months and three years. The New York Times reported that de Valera had a united Legislature and the full support of the Catholic hierarchy behind the crackdown.

=== Drafting the new Constitution ===
De Valera did not at first set out to draft a new constitution, believing that radical reform of the 1922 document might suffice. The decision to write an entirely new one was taken in 1934, during the Economic War. A committee of civil servants was appointed that year, and in May 1935 John Hearne, legal adviser at the Department of External Affairs, submitted draft heads. Drafting continued into 1936 under de Valera's direction in strict secrecy, and he did not confide in his cabinet. Submissions from the Jesuits and from Fr John Charles McQuaid, a future Archbishop of Dublin, influenced the articles on personal rights, the family, education, property, religion and directive principles of social policy.

In early 1937 an editorial committee under Maurice Moynihan prepared the text, and on 16 March the printed draft was circulated confidentially to members of the Executive Council and other selected persons. The draft article on religion met opposition within the Executive Council, and between 3 and 27 April de Valera consulted the papal nuncio, the Catholic and Church of Ireland archbishops of Dublin and the moderator designate of the Methodist Church, among others. Joseph Walshe was sent to Rome and returned with the news that the Holy See would remain neutral on the wording of the revised article. The draft was published on 1 May 1937, had its second reading in the Dáil on 11 to 13 May and was approved on 14 June by 62 votes to 48, with the plebiscite to be held on the same day as the general election.

== Campaign ==
=== Opposition to the draft Constitution ===
Women's organisations began campaigning as soon as the draft was published. The National University Women Graduates' Association (NUWGA) was joined by the Joint Committee of Women's Societies and Social Workers, the National Council of Women and the Irish Women Workers' Union. They objected to Articles 40, 41 and 45, which they read as relegating women to a domestic role and endangering their place in public life and employment. Before the Dáil approved the draft, the phrase "without distinction of sex" was restored to the provisions on citizenship and voting, although de Valera thought it unnecessary, and the wording of Article 45 was amended. Articles 40 and 41 were not changed. The campaign then called for rejection of the whole Constitution and held a meeting in the Mansion House on 21 June, attended by between 1,200 and 1,500 people. The Irish Press, which supported Fianna Fáil, dismissed the women's objections as politically inspired, and de Valera attributed the campaign to a political move by John A. Costello.

Fine Gael opposed the draft on broader grounds. In the Irish Independent on 6 May 1937 Costello criticised the creation of a President, and he later described the draft in the Dáil as "a tyranny which masquerades under the cloak of democracy". The newspaper warned that the powers of the presidency savoured more of fascism than of democracy. Fianna Fáil replied that the 1922 Constitution could allow a dictatorship and that only a new constitution would provide proper safeguards. The Irish Times, concerned to defend Ireland's membership of the Commonwealth, urged voters to oppose both Fianna Fáil and the Constitution. On the left, the Secretariat of the Communist Party of Ireland urged voters to reject the social policies embodied in the Constitution, which it said protected the property of the possessing classes and placed women's rights in jeopardy, and to remove Fine Gael, which it described as imperialist and fascist. Labour, which also opposed ratification, objected that the Constitution did not declare a republic.

=== Platforms and campaign events ===
A digitalised version of an election poster issued by Fine Gael during the campaign

De Valera opened the formal Fianna Fáil campaign with a rally in O'Connell Street, Dublin, on 16 June, where he criticised the Irish Independent, and he sought to reassure voters that the new presidency would not allow a dictator to seize power, saying that even opponents of Fianna Fáil's policies could vote for the Constitution with a clear conscience. In the final days of the campaign, in County Donegal, he called the 1922 Constitution "a ramshackle affair" and promised a constitution enacted by the votes of the Irish people rather than by a foreign parliament. The press was partisan. The Irish Independent recommended a No vote on 18 June, Fianna Fáil took out a full-page advertisement on its front page on 26 June, and a count of column inches showed the Irish Press giving Fianna Fáil 92 inches to 18 for Fine Gael, against 56 and 57 in the Independent.

Fine Gael, led by Cosgrave, appealed to voters on an economic programme. It promised to reopen the British market to Irish cattle, sheep, pigs and poultry, to exempt agricultural land from rates, to provide cheap loans of 3% to restock farms, to fix a minimum price for milk, to abolish taxes on food and to provide free school books. It also claimed that Fianna Fáil's policies had cut agricultural labourers' wages by 3s a week, and promised not to reduce unemployment assistance or other benefits. The opposition made the high cost of living its main issue, according to The New York Times, whose correspondent reported that de Valera appealed to Dublin workers to bear their share of the burden of ensuring that farmers received an economic price, telling them that the strong must help the weak. The same correspondent described the campaign as one of the most momentous yet most orderly in the history of the Free State, and wrote that Cosgrave's party had begun with high hopes of a close race, while de Valera, who had appeared to be on the defensive at a Dublin meeting a fortnight earlier, recovered ground on a whirlwind tour of the country that ended with a rally of more than 50,000 people in College Green on 30 June. At that rally Seán Lemass outlined a labour code that the government proposed to introduce, and de Valera asked voters whether they wanted a constitution dictated from outside or one made by a free people. Fianna Fáil's party secretary, James Davin, predicted that the party would win 73 seats, enough to be independent of Labour, while impartial observers estimated 70. Some events were nonetheless disorderly. At a Fair Day rally in Claremorris, County Mayo, in May 1937, Fianna Fáil TDs Micheál Clery, Edward Moane and Seán MacEllin faced a hostile crowd of Fine Gael supporters, and physical fighting broke out at the edge of the gathering.

A New York Times correspondent in London reported that British opinion took de Valera's return for granted, expecting working-class electors to support him because there was more work at higher wages in Ireland than for at least a decade, and regarded the Constitution as changing names rather than conditions. The paper noted that the Constitution's claim of sovereignty over the six counties of Northern Ireland aroused little concern in Britain unless it was backed by force, and that some in Britain hoped the annuities dispute would be easier to settle after the election.

== Result ==
Election to the 9th Dáil – 1 July 1937
Party	Leader	Seats	±	% of seats	First pref. votes	% FPv	±%
Fianna Fáil	Éamon de Valera	69	–8	50.0	599,040	45.2	–4.5
Fine Gael	W. T. Cosgrave	48	–11	34.8	461,171	34.8	–4.8
Labour	William Norton	13	+5	9.4	135,758	10.3	+4.6
Independent	N/A	8	–1	5.8	128,480	9.7	+4.7
Spoilt votes					27,824	—N/a	—N/a
Total		138	–15	100	1,352,273	100	—N/a
Electorate/Turnout					1,775,055	76.2	—N/a

=== Voting summary ===
First preference vote
Fianna Fáil	45.23%
Fine Gael	34.82%
Labour	10.25%
Independent	9.70%

=== Seats summary ===
Dáil seats
Fianna Fáil	50.00%
Fine Gael	34.78%
Labour	9.42%
Independent	5.80%

=== Count ===
The first returns, reported by The New York Times on 3 July, showed Fianna Fáil ahead in many constituencies and the "Cosgraveites" faring badly. James Larkin won a seat in Dublin North-East, defeating Richard Mulcahy, and de Valera was elected on the first count in Clare, although with 14,012 votes, compared with 18,000 in 1933, a fall the paper attributed to local dissension over the selection of Fianna Fáil candidates. Early plebiscite returns from Dublin were close, with 18,651 votes for the Constitution and 16,496 against in Dublin North-East, and 32,464 for and 31,438 against in Dublin South, which the paper took to show that the feminist and "extremist" campaign had had some effect. By 5 July, with 128 of the 138 seats filled, Fianna Fáil held 65 seats against 63 for all other groups, and the paper reported that its hope of a majority was fading as results arrived from the Cork constituencies. When the last deputy was elected for Cork West on 6 July, the final line-up was Fianna Fáil 69, Fine Gael 48, Labour 13 and independents eight, leaving de Valera without even a majority of one over all other parties.

=== Analysis ===
Fianna Fáil lost eight seats and its share of the first-preference vote fell by 4.5 points, the first fall in its vote in five elections. The reduction in the size of the Dáil meant that it still held half the seats, one short of a majority, and could form a minority government. The New York Times called the result a stalemate and a disappointment for de Valera, who had asked the country not to return him without a comfortable majority, and noted that his first returns had promised a sweeping victory that slipped away late in the count. Fine Gael, contesting its first general election, won 48 seats, 11 fewer than Cumann na nGaedheal and the National Centre Party had won together in 1933, and its share of the vote fell by 4.8 points. The same newspaper referred throughout to the "Cosgraveites" and described Fine Gael as former William T. Cosgrave's party, reflecting the view that it was a continuation of Cumann na nGaedheal. Labour won 13 seats on 10.3% of the vote, with support rising at Fianna Fáil's expense, and Norton topped the poll for the first time in the newly created Carlow–Kildare constituency. Eight independents were elected, two of them Independent Labour.

The Constitution was approved by 685,105 votes to 526,945. Only five constituencies rejected it: Cork West, Dublin County, Dublin Townships (which returned Costello), Sligo and Wicklow. Many voters spoiled their plebiscite papers or abstained, and provisional returns recorded 116,196 spoiled or blank ballots, which the historian Patrick Geoghegan suggests reflected voters who were unconvinced but unwilling to block the proposal. The New York Times also noted that more than 110,000 voters spoiled their ballots "whether by accident or design". The failure of the women's campaign has been attributed principally to its limited, mainly Dublin-based, middle-class appeal, and to the irrelevance of the abstract concept of equality to the daily lives of most women.

== Changes in membership ==
=== First time TDs ===
- Ernest Benson
- Cormac Breslin
- Patrick Browne
- Thomas Burke
- A. P. Byrne
- Michael Colbert
- Matthew Davis
- John Esmonde
- John Friel
- Archie Heron
- Timothy Linehan
- Gerrard McGowan
- John Munnelly
- Jeremiah Ryan
- Laurence Walsh

=== Re-elected TDs ===
- Patrick Gorry
- Joseph Mongan

=== Defeated TDs ===
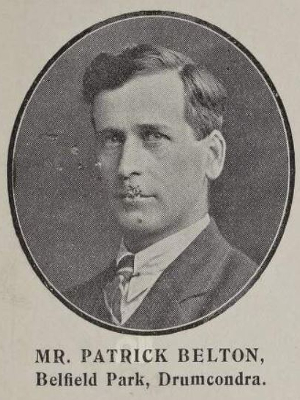
A notable defeat in this election was Patrick Belton in Dublin County, despite in his leadership of the Irish Christian Front during a period of strong anti-communism in Ireland.

- Patrick Belton
- William Broderick
- William Browne
- Eamonn Cooney
- Robert Davitt
- Stephen Jordan
- James McGuire
- James Morrisroe
- Patrick Murphy
- Patrick O'Dowd
- Margaret Mary Pearse
- James Reidy

=== Retiring TDs ===
- Hugh Doherty
- Eamon Donnelly
- Séamus Keely
- Patrick Kehoe
- William Kent

=== Vacancies ===
- Conor Maguire (Resigned on appointment as judge in 1936)

== Government formation ==
Fianna Fáil formed a minority government, the 8th Executive Council of the Irish Free State, with the support of the Labour Party. The New York Times observed that, with the Ceann Comhairle voting only in the event of a tie, de Valera would have 68 effective votes, and that the independent Thomas Burke of Clare had pledged his support. It expected him either to reach a working arrangement with Labour or to go to the country again early in 1938. The Constitution came into operation 180 days after the plebiscite, on 29 December 1937, when this became the 1st Government of Ireland. Douglas Hyde was elected the first President of Ireland unopposed on 4 May 1938. De Valera called a further general election within a year, and the 1938 election followed the agreement of April 1938 that ended the Economic War.

== Seanad election ==
After the coming into operation of the Constitution, an election took place under Article 53 of the Constitution for the 2nd Seanad in March 1938.
