= P. J. Ruttledge =

Irish politician (1892–1952)

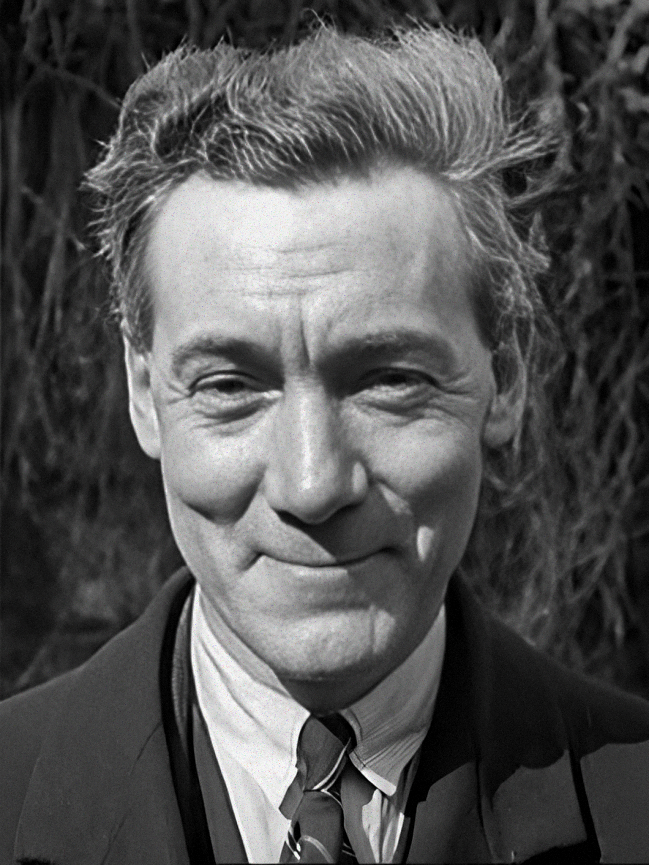
- Ruttledge in 1933

Minister for Local Government and Public Health
- In office 8 September 1939 – 14 August 1941
- President: Éamon de Valera
- Preceded by: Seán T. O'Kelly
- Succeeded by: Seán MacEntee

Minister for Justice
- In office 8 February 1933 – 8 September 1939
- President: Éamon de Valera
- Preceded by: James Geoghegan
- Succeeded by: Gerald Boland

Minister for Lands and Fisheries
- In office 9 March 1932 – 8 February 1933
- President: Éamon de Valera
- Preceded by: Fionán Lynch
- Succeeded by: Joseph Connolly

Vice President of Sinn Féin
- In office 11 July 1923 – 16 May 1926
- Leader: Éamon de Valera
- Preceded by: Arthur Griffith
- Succeeded by: John Madden

Teachta Dála
- In office August 1923 – 8 May 1952
- Constituency: Mayo North
- In office May 1921 – August 1923
- Constituency: Mayo North and West

Personal details
- Born: 1 January 1892 Ballina, County Mayo, Ireland
- Died: 8 May 1952 (aged 60) Galway, Ireland
- Party: Fianna Fáil; Sinn Féin (until 1926)
- Spouse: Helena Roddy (m. 1928)
- Children: 4
- Education: Trinity College Dublin

Military service
- Branch/service: Irish Republican Army; Anti-Treaty IRA
- Battles/wars: Irish War of Independence; Irish Civil War

Patrick Joseph Ruttledge (1 January 1892 – 8 May 1952) was an Irish Fianna Fáil politician who served as Minister for Local Government and Public Health from 1939 to 1941, Minister for Justice from 1933 to 1939, Minister for Lands and Fisheries from 1932 to 1933 and Vice President of Sinn Féin from 1923 to 1926. He served as a Teachta Dála (TD) from 1921 to 1951.

== Early life ==
Born in Ballina, County Mayo, in 1892. He was educated at St Muredach's College and later at St. Enda's School, Rathfarnham, Dublin, run by Patrick Pearse. After studying at Trinity College Dublin, he qualified as a solicitor in 1918 and built up a practice in his home town.

== Revolutionary ==
During the Irish War of Independence he was active in the Irish Republican Army. He was a close friend of Seán Mac Diarmada, with whom he lived for some time. He also took part in local politics, becoming chair of Ballina Urban Council from 1919 to 1932 and chair of Mayo County Council from 1922 to 1926.

== Electoral politics ==
He was first elected to Dáil Éireann in 1921 as a Sinn Féin TD for Mayo North and West. He opposed the Anglo-Irish Treaty of 1921 and joined the Republican forces and was seriously injured during the Civil War. He was re-elected to the Dáil again in 1923 for Mayo North and in a further ten elections until 1951. In 1926, Ruttledge was a founder-member of Fianna Fáil. In the Dail (in 1928) Ruttledge put forth a proposal for a committee to review the many long prison sentences under which many Republicans were still being held. He stated that the long sentences "reflected a partisan spirit in keeping with the vendetta by prominent political leaders at the time."

=== Cabinet positions ===
He joined the cabinet of Éamon de Valera in 1932, serving as Minister for Lands and Fisheries, Minister for Justice and Minister for Local Government and Public Health, resigning in 1941 for the officially stated reason of "ill health". However, it is speculated by some historians that his actual motivation for the resignation was that he morally objected to the execution of IRA members by the Fianna Fáil government. Ruttledge continued to work as TD for over a decade after his resignation despite his "ill health".

=== Minister of Justice ===
During Ruttledge's tenure as Minister for Justice, three IRA men were executed for IRA activities but eight others had their death sentences commuted. Ruttledge worked to suppress a movement he considered to be fascist (the Blueshirts). In February 1933 he had their leader Eoin O'Duffy removed from his position as the Commissioner of the Irish national police force - the Garda Síochána. In 1934 Ruttledge introduced anti-fascist legislation that would prevent the Blueshirts from wearing their uniforms in public (also known as the Blueshirts Bill). In 1937 Ruttledge banned the annual IRA Easter Rising commemoration in Castlebar, County Mayo. Violence ensued with police baton charging marchers with numerous injuries and 13 arrests for Civil Disobedience (including future hunger striker Jack McNeela).

Ruttledge died in 1952 while still a member of the Dáil. He was described by The Irish Times as 'a gentle, kind and upright man'. He married Helena Roddy in 1928, and they had one son who died young and three daughters. A horse breeder, he was a member of the Turf Club and won the Irish Derby with Mondragon in 1939.

Political offices
Preceded by Fionán Lynch	Minister for Lands and Fisheries; 1932–1933	Succeeded by Joseph Connolly
Preceded by James Geoghegan	Minister for Justice; 1933–1939	Succeeded by Gerald Boland
Preceded by Seán T. O'Kelly	Minister for Local Government and Public Health; 1939–1941	Succeeded by Seán MacEntee
Party political offices
Preceded by Michael O'Flanagan	Vice President of Sinn Féin; 1923–1926; With: Kathleen Lynn	Succeeded by Mary MacSwiney and John Madden

Dáil	Election	Deputy (Party)	Deputy (Party)	Deputy (Party)	Deputy (Party)
2nd	1921	Joseph MacBride (SF)	John Crowley (SF)	Thomas Derrig (SF)	P. J. Ruttledge (SF)
3rd	1922	Joseph MacBride (PT-SF)	John Crowley (AT-SF)	Thomas Derrig (AT-SF)	P. J. Ruttledge (AT-SF)
4th	1923	Constituency abolished. See Mayo North and Mayo South			

Dáil	Election	Deputy (Party)	Deputy (Party)	Deputy (Party)	Deputy (Party)
4th	1923	P. J. Ruttledge (Rep)	Henry Coyle (CnaG)	John Crowley (Rep)	Joseph McGrath (CnaG)
4th	1924 by-election	P. J. Ruttledge (Rep)	John Madden (Rep)	John Crowley (Rep)	Joseph McGrath (CnaG)
4th	1925 by-election	P. J. Ruttledge (Rep)	John Madden (Rep)	John Crowley (Rep)	Michael Tierney (CnaG)
5th	1927 (Jun)	P. J. Ruttledge (FF)	John Madden (SF)	Michael Davis (CnaG)	Mark Henry (CnaG)
6th	1927 (Sep)	P. J. Ruttledge (FF)	Micheál Clery (FF)	Michael Davis (CnaG)	Mark Henry (CnaG)
7th	1932	P. J. Ruttledge (FF)	Micheál Clery (FF)	Michael Davis (CnaG)	Patrick O'Hara (CnaG)
8th	1933	P. J. Ruttledge (FF)	Micheál Clery (FF)	Michael Davis (CnaG)	James Morrisroe (CnaG)
9th	1937	P. J. Ruttledge (FF)	John Munnelly (FF)	Patrick Browne (FG)	3 seats 1937–1969
10th	1938	P. J. Ruttledge (FF)	John Munnelly (FF)	Patrick Browne (FG)	3 seats 1937–1969
11th	1943	P. J. Ruttledge (FF)	James Kilroy (FF)	Patrick Browne (FG)	3 seats 1937–1969
12th	1944	P. J. Ruttledge (FF)	James Kilroy (FF)	Patrick Browne (FG)	3 seats 1937–1969
13th	1948	P. J. Ruttledge (FF)	James Kilroy (FF)	Patrick Browne (FG)	3 seats 1937–1969
14th	1951	P. J. Ruttledge (FF)	Thomas O'Hara (CnaT)	Patrick Browne (FG)	3 seats 1937–1969
14th	1952 by-election	Phelim Calleary (FF)	Thomas O'Hara (CnaT)	Patrick Browne (FG)	3 seats 1937–1969
15th	1954	Phelim Calleary (FF)	Thomas O'Hara (CnaT)	Patrick Lindsay (FG)	3 seats 1937–1969
16th	1957	Phelim Calleary (FF)	Seán Doherty (FF)	Patrick Lindsay (FG)	3 seats 1937–1969
17th	1961	Phelim Calleary (FF)	Joseph Lenehan (Ind.)	Michael Browne (FG)	3 seats 1937–1969
18th	1965	Phelim Calleary (FF)	Patrick Lindsay (FG)	Thomas O'Hara (FG)	3 seats 1937–1969
19th	1969	Constituency abolished. See Mayo East and Mayo West			
