= 14th Dáil =

TDs from 1951 to 1954

←	13th Dáil	15th Dáil	→

Overview
- Legislative body: Dáil Éireann
- Jurisdiction: Ireland
- Meeting place: Leinster House
- Term: 13 June 1951 – 24 April 1954
- Election: 1951 general election
- Government: 6th government of Ireland
- Members: 147
- Ceann Comhairle: Patrick Hogan
- Taoiseach: Éamon de Valera
- Tánaiste: Seán Lemass
- Chief Whip: Donnchadh Ó Briain
- Leader of the Opposition: John A. Costello

Sessions
- 1st: 13 June 1951 – 19 July 1951
- 2nd: 31 October 1951 – 24 July 1952
- 3rd: 22 October 1952 – 5 August 1953
- 4th: 20 October 1953 – 23 April 1954

The 14th Dáil was elected at the 1951 general election on 30 May 1951 and met on 13 June 1951. The members of Dáil Éireann, the house of representatives of the Oireachtas (legislature), of Ireland are known as TDs. It sat with the 7th Seanad as the two Houses of the Oireachtas.

On 24 April 1954, President Seán T. O'Kelly dissolved the Dáil at the request of the Taoiseach Éamon de Valera. The 14th Dáil lasted 2 years, 315 days.

== Composition of the 14th Dáil ==
- 6th government

Party	May 1951	Apr. 1954	Change
Fianna Fáil	69	71	▲2
Fine Gael	40	45	▲5
Labour	16	14	▼2
Clann na Talmhan	6	6	Steady
Clann na Poblachta	2	2	Steady
Monetary Reform	1	—N/a	▼1
Independent	13	8	▼5
Ceann Comhairle	—N/a	1	▲1
Total	147		

=== Graphical representation ===
This is a graphical comparison of party strengths in the 14th Dáil from June 1951. This was not the official seating plan.

== Ceann Comhairle ==
On the meeting of the Dáil, Patrick Hogan (Lab) was proposed as Ceann Comhairle by John A. Costello (FG) and seconded by Joseph Blowick (CnaT). His election was approved without a vote. Hogan had served as Leas-Cheann Comhairle from 1927 to 1928, from 1932 to 1938 and from 1948 to 1951.

== TDs by constituency ==
The 147 TDs elected at the 1951 general election are listed by Dáil constituency.

Members of the 14th Dáil
Constituency	Name	Party
Carlow–Kilkenny	Patrick Crotty	Fine Gael
Carlow–Kilkenny	Joseph Hughes	Fine Gael
Carlow–Kilkenny	Francis Humphreys	Fianna Fáil
Carlow–Kilkenny	Thomas Derrig	Fianna Fáil
Carlow–Kilkenny	Thomas Walsh	Fianna Fáil
Cavan	Patrick O'Reilly	Fine Gael
Cavan	Michael Sheridan	Fianna Fáil
Cavan	Paddy Smith	Fianna Fáil
Cavan	John Tully	Clann na Poblachta
Clare	Éamon de Valera	Fianna Fáil
Clare	Patrick Hillery	Fianna Fáil
Clare	Patrick Hogan	Labour
Clare	William Murphy	Fine Gael
Cork Borough	James Hickey	Labour
Cork Borough	Seán McCarthy	Fianna Fáil
Cork Borough	Patrick McGrath	Fianna Fáil
Cork Borough	Jack Lynch	Fianna Fáil
Cork Borough	Thomas F. O'Higgins	Fine Gael
Cork East	Martin Corry	Fianna Fáil
Cork East	Seán Keane	Labour
Cork East	Patrick O'Gorman	Fine Gael
Cork North	Patrick McAuliffe	Labour
Cork North	Seán Moylan	Fianna Fáil
Cork North	Denis O'Sullivan	Fine Gael
Cork South	Seán Buckley	Fianna Fáil
Cork South	Dan Desmond	Labour
Cork South	Patrick Lehane	Independent
Cork West	Seán Collins	Fine Gael
Cork West	Michael Pat Murphy	Labour
Cork West	Timothy O'Sullivan	Fianna Fáil
Donegal East	Neil Blaney	Fianna Fáil
Donegal East	Liam Cunningham	Fianna Fáil
Donegal East	Daniel McMenamin	Fine Gael
Donegal East	William Sheldon	Independent
Donegal West	Joseph Brennan	Fianna Fáil
Donegal West	Cormac Breslin	Fianna Fáil
Donegal West	Patrick O'Donnell	Fine Gael
Dublin County	Patrick Burke	Fianna Fáil
Dublin County	Seán Dunne	Labour
Dublin County	Éamon Rooney	Fine Gael
Dublin North-Central	Vivion de Valera	Fianna Fáil
Dublin North-Central	Colm Gallagher	Fianna Fáil
Dublin North-Central	Patrick McGilligan	Fine Gael
Dublin North-East	Jack Belton	Fine Gael
Dublin North-East	Alfie Byrne	Independent
Dublin North-East	Harry Colley	Fianna Fáil
Dublin North-East	Peadar Cowan	Independent
Dublin North-East	Oscar Traynor	Fianna Fáil
Dublin North-West	Cormac Breathnach	Fianna Fáil
Dublin North-West	A. P. Byrne	Independent
Dublin North-West	Declan Costello	Fine Gael
Dublin South-Central	Philip Brady	Fianna Fáil
Dublin South-Central	Maurice E. Dockrell	Fine Gael
Dublin South-Central	James Larkin Jnr	Labour
Dublin South-Central	Seán Lemass	Fianna Fáil
Dublin South-Central	John McCann	Fianna Fáil
Dublin South-East	John A. Costello	Fine Gael
Dublin South-East	Noël Browne	Independent
Dublin South-East	Seán MacEntee	Fianna Fáil
Dublin South-West	Robert Briscoe	Fianna Fáil
Dublin South-West	Bernard Butler	Fianna Fáil
Dublin South-West	Peadar Doyle	Fine Gael
Dublin South-West	Michael ffrench-O'Carroll	Independent
Dublin South-West	Seán MacBride	Clann na Poblachta
Dún Laoghaire and Rathdown	Seán Brady	Fianna Fáil
Dún Laoghaire and Rathdown	Liam Cosgrave	Fine Gael
Dún Laoghaire and Rathdown	H. Percy Dockrell	Fine Gael
Galway North	Michael Donnellan	Clann na Talmhan
Galway North	James Hession	Fine Gael
Galway North	Mark Killilea Snr	Fianna Fáil
Galway South	Patrick Beegan	Fianna Fáil
Galway South	Patrick Cawley	Fine Gael
Galway South	Frank Fahy	Fianna Fáil
Galway West	Gerald Bartley	Fianna Fáil
Galway West	Peadar Duignan	Fianna Fáil
Galway West	John Mannion Snr	Fine Gael
Kerry North	John Lynch	Fine Gael
Kerry North	Patrick Finucane	Independent
Kerry North	Tom McEllistrim	Fianna Fáil
Kerry North	Dan Spring	Labour
Kerry South	Honor Crowley	Fianna Fáil
Kerry South	John Flynn	Independent
Kerry South	Patrick Palmer	Fine Gael
Kildare	Thomas Harris	Fianna Fáil
Kildare	William Norton	Labour
Kildare	Gerard Sweetman	Fine Gael
Leix–Offaly	Patrick Boland	Fianna Fáil
Leix–Offaly	William Davin	Labour
Leix–Offaly	Oliver J. Flanagan	Independent
Leix–Offaly	Peadar Maher	Fianna Fáil
Leix–Offaly	Tom O'Higgins	Fine Gael
Limerick East	Daniel Bourke	Fianna Fáil
Limerick East	Tadhg Crowley	Fianna Fáil
Limerick East	Michael Keyes	Labour
Limerick East	James Reidy	Fine Gael
Limerick West	James Collins	Fianna Fáil
Limerick West	David Madden	Fine Gael
Limerick West	Donnchadh Ó Briain	Fianna Fáil
Longford–Westmeath	Frank Carter	Fianna Fáil
Longford–Westmeath	Erskine H. Childers	Fianna Fáil
Longford–Westmeath	Charles Fagan	Independent
Longford–Westmeath	Michael Kennedy	Fianna Fáil
Longford–Westmeath	Seán Mac Eoin	Fine Gael
Louth	Frank Aiken	Fianna Fáil
Louth	James Coburn	Fine Gael
Louth	Laurence Walsh	Fianna Fáil
Mayo North	Patrick Browne	Fine Gael
Mayo North	Thomas O'Hara	Clann na Talmhan
Mayo North	P. J. Ruttledge	Fianna Fáil
Mayo South	Joseph Blowick	Clann na Talmhan
Mayo South	Dominick Cafferky	Clann na Talmhan
Mayo South	Seán Flanagan	Fianna Fáil
Mayo South	Mícheál Ó Móráin	Fianna Fáil
Meath	Patrick Giles	Fine Gael
Meath	Michael Hilliard	Fianna Fáil
Meath	Matthew O'Reilly	Fianna Fáil
Monaghan	James Dillon	Independent
Monaghan	Patrick Maguire	Fianna Fáil
Monaghan	Bridget Rice	Fianna Fáil
Roscommon	John Beirne	Clann na Talmhan
Roscommon	Gerald Boland	Fianna Fáil
Roscommon	John Finan	Clann na Talmhan
Roscommon	Jack McQuillan	Independent
Sligo–Leitrim	Stephen Flynn	Fianna Fáil
Sligo–Leitrim	Eugene Gilbride	Fianna Fáil
Sligo–Leitrim	Mary Reynolds	Fine Gael
Sligo–Leitrim	Joseph Roddy	Fine Gael
Sligo–Leitrim	Patrick Rogers	Fine Gael
Tipperary North	John Fanning	Fianna Fáil
Tipperary North	Daniel Morrissey	Fine Gael
Tipperary North	Mary Ryan	Fianna Fáil
Tipperary South	Dan Breen	Fianna Fáil
Tipperary South	Patrick Crowe	Fine Gael
Tipperary South	Michael Davern	Fianna Fáil
Tipperary South	Richard Mulcahy	Fine Gael
Waterford	Thomas Kyne	Labour
Waterford	Patrick Little	Fianna Fáil
Waterford	John Ormonde	Fianna Fáil
Waterford	Bridget Redmond	Fine Gael
Wexford	Denis Allen	Fianna Fáil
Wexford	Brendan Corish	Labour
Wexford	Anthony Esmonde	Fine Gael
Wexford	John O'Leary	Labour
Wexford	James Ryan	Fianna Fáil
Wicklow	Thomas Brennan	Fianna Fáil
Wicklow	Patrick Cogan	Independent
Wicklow	James Everett	Labour

== Changes ==
Date	Constituency	Loss	Gain	Note
13 June 1951	Clare	Labour	Ceann Comhairle	Patrick Hogan takes office as Ceann Comhairle
13 April 1952	Limerick East	Fianna Fáil		Death of Daniel Bourke
3 May 1952	Waterford	Fine Gael		Death of Bridget Redmond
8 May 1952	Mayo North	Fianna Fáil		Death of P. J. Ruttledge
10 May 1952	Monaghan	Independent	Fine Gael	James Dillon re-joins Fine Gael
12 May 1952	Longford–Westmeath	Independent	Fine Gael	Charles Fagan re-joins Fine Gael
12 May 1952	Leix–Offaly	Monetary Reform	Fine Gael	Oliver J. Flanagan joins Fine Gael
26 June 1952	Limerick East		Fine Gael	John Carew wins the seat vacated by the death of Bourke
26 June 1952	Waterford		Fianna Fáil	William Kenneally wins the seat vacated by the death of Redmond
26 June 1952	Mayo North		Fianna Fáil	Phelim Calleary holds the seat vacated by the death of Ruttledge
26 July 1952	Dublin North-West	Independent		Death of A. P. Byrne
12 November 1952	Dublin North-West		Independent	Thomas Byrne holds the seat vacated by the death of his brother A. P. Byrne
22 January 1953	Wicklow	Fianna Fáil		Death of Thomas Brennan
29 March 1953	Cork East	Labour		Death of Seán Keane
18 June 1953	Wicklow		Fine Gael	Mark Deering gains the seat vacated by the death of Brennan
18 June 1953	Cork East		Fine Gael	Richard Barry wins the seat vacated by the death of Keane
12 July 1953	Galway South	Fianna Fáil		Death of Frank Fahy
21 August 1953	Galway South		Fianna Fáil	Robert Lahiffe holds the seat vacated by the death of Fahy
28 October 1953	Dublin South-East	Independent	Fianna Fáil	Noël Browne joins Fianna Fáil
28 October 1953	Dublin South-West	Independent	Fianna Fáil	Michael ffrench-O'Carroll joins Fianna Fáil
28 October 1953	Wicklow	Independent	Fianna Fáil	Patrick Cogan joins Fianna Fáil
1 November 1953	Cork Borough	Fine Gael		Death of Thomas F. O'Higgins
5 December 1953	Louth	Fine Gael		Death of James Coburn
3 March 1954	Cork Borough		Fine Gael	Stephen Barrett holds the seat vacated by the death of O'Higgins
3 March 1954	Louth		Fine Gael	George Coburn holds the seat vacated by the death of his father James Coburn
