= Galway North (Dáil constituency) =

Dáil constituency (1948–1961)

- Former Dáil constituency

Former constituency
- Created: 1948
- Abolished: 1961
- Seats: 3
- Local government area: County Galway
- Created from: Galway East; Galway West
- Replaced by: Galway East; Galway West

Galway North was a parliamentary constituency represented in Dáil Éireann, the lower house of the Irish parliament or Oireachtas from 1948 to 1961. The constituency elected 3 deputies (Teachtaí Dála, commonly known as TDs) to the Dáil, on the system of proportional representation by means of the single transferable vote (PR-STV).

== History ==
The constituency was created under the Electoral (Amendment) Act 1947 for the 1948 general election to Dáil Éireann. It was abolished under the Electoral (Amendment) Act 1961, when the three existing Galway constituencies were replaced by the two new constituencies of Galway East and Galway West.

== Boundaries ==
The administrative county of Galway except the portion thereof which was comprised in the County Constituencies of Galway West and Galway South.

== TDs ==
Teachtaí Dála (TDs) for Galway North 1948–1961
Key to parties: FF = Fianna Fáil; CnaT = Clann na Talmhan; FG = Fine Gael
Dáil	Election	Deputy (Party)	Deputy (Party)	Deputy (Party)
13th	1948	Mark Killilea Snr (FF)	Michael F. Kitt (FF)	Michael Donnellan (CnaT)
14th	1951	Mark Killilea Snr (FF)	James Hession (FG)	Michael Donnellan (CnaT)
15th	1954	Mark Killilea Snr (FF)	James Hession (FG)	Michael Donnellan (CnaT)
16th	1957	Mark Killilea Snr (FF)	Michael F. Kitt (FF)	Michael Donnellan (CnaT)
17th	1961	Constituency abolished. See Galway East and Galway West		

Note: The columns in this table are used only for presentational purposes, and no significance should be attached to the order of columns. For details of the order in which seats were won at each election, see the detailed results of that election.

== Elections ==
*: Outgoing TD

=== 1957 general election ===
1957 general election: Galway North
Party	Candidate	FPv%	Count		
Party	Candidate	FPv%	1	2	3
Clann na Talmhan	Michael Donnellan	33.1	7,399		
Fianna Fáil	Michael F. Kitt	23.3	5,215	5,358	5,946
Fianna Fáil	Mark Killilea Snr	21.6	4,826	4,939	5,346
Sinn Féin	Pádraig Ó Ceallaigh	11.4	2,551	2,716	
Fine Gael	James Hession	10.6	2,380	3,765	4,302
Electorate: 29,884 Valid: 22,371 Quota: 5,593 Turnout: 74.9%

=== 1954 general election ===
1954 general election: Galway North
Party	Candidate	FPv%	Count			
Party	Candidate	FPv%	1	2	3	4
Clann na Talmhan	Michael Donnellan	33.7	7,889			
Fianna Fáil	Michael F. Kitt	19.7	4,619	5,195	5,266	5,352
Fianna Fáil	Mark Killilea Snr	18.9	4,430	5,600	5,665	5,834
Fine Gael	James Hession	18.7	4,374	4,553	6,453	
Fianna Fáil	Thomas King	9.0	2,099			
Electorate: 30,452 Valid: 23,411 Quota: 5,853 Turnout: 76.9%

=== 1951 general election ===
1951 general election: Galway North
Party	Candidate	FPv%	Count			
Party	Candidate	FPv%	1	2	3	4
Clann na Talmhan	Michael Donnellan	34.8	7,923			
Fianna Fáil	Mark Killilea Snr	18.5	4,205	4,287	4,391	5,952
Fianna Fáil	Michael F. Kitt	18.1	4,120	4,200	4,236	4,886
Fine Gael	James Hession	12.7	2,882	4,291	5,581	5,764
Fianna Fáil	Seán Glynn	10.5	2,382	2,511	2,632	
Clann na Poblachta	William Burke	5.6	1,265	1,793		
Electorate: 31,373 Valid: 22,777 Quota: 5,695 Turnout: 72.60%

=== 1948 general election ===
1948 general election: Galway North
Party	Candidate	FPv%	Count							
Party	Candidate	FPv%	1	2	3	4	5	6	7	8
Fianna Fáil	Mark Killilea Snr	19.9	4,636	4,663	4,682	4,728	4,808	4,961	6,816	
Clann na Talmhan	Michael Donnellan	19.6	4,582	5,072	5,171	5,251	5,861			
Fianna Fáil	Michael F. Kitt	16.0	3,742	3,851	3,876	3,897	4,033	4,166	4,814	5,782
Fianna Fáil	Seán Glynn	12.1	2,811	2,826	2,838	2,850	2,882	2,924		
Labour	Robert Malachy Burke	9.7	2,273	2,309	2,418	2,466	2,704	3,971	4,162	4,175
Clann na Poblachta	John Nohilly	6.7	1,562	1,606	1,651	2,352	2,575			
Fine Gael	Mark Wall	4.5	1,046	1,074	1,658	1,679				
Clann na Poblachta	Michael Mannion	4.0	922	944	963					
Fine Gael	William Allen	3.8	886	942						
Clann na Talmhan	Patrick Collins	3.8	876							
Electorate: 32,389 Valid: 23,336 Quota: 5,835 Turnout: 72.05%

== See also ==
- Dáil constituencies
- Politics of the Republic of Ireland
- Historic Dáil constituencies
- Elections in the Republic of Ireland
