= Robert Lahiffe =

Irish politician (1909–1975)

Senator
- In office 22 May 1957 – 23 June 1965
- Constituency: Agricultural Panel

Teachta Dála
- In office August 1953 – March 1957
- In office February 1948 – May 1951
- Constituency: Galway South

Personal details
- Born: 9 March 1909; Gort, County Galway, Ireland
- Died: 8 March 1975 (aged 65); County Galway, Ireland
- Political party: Fianna Fáil

Robert Lahiffe (9 March 1909 – 8 March 1975) was an Irish Fianna Fáil politician and farmer. He served in the Oireachtas for 7 years as a Teachta Dála (TD), and then as a Senator for 8 years.

Lahiffe was born in the townland of Cloone, Gort, County Galway, to James N. Lahiff and Maria Quinn.

Lahiffe was elected to Dáil Éireann in the 1948 general election as a Fianna Fáil TD for the Galway South constituency. He was defeated in the 1951 general election by Fine Gael's Patrick Cawley, but was re-elected two years later in a by-election in August 1953 following the death of Frank Fahy, a Fianna Fáil TD who as Ceann Comhairle had been returned unopposed in 1951. Lahiffe held the seat in the general election in 1954, but was ousted again in the 1957 general election. Fianna Fáil had run three candidates in three-seat constituency, and Lahiffe was beaten by his first-time running-mate Michael Carty.

He was then elected to the 9th Seanad by the Agricultural Panel, which re-elected him in 1961. However, he was defeated in the 1965 election to the 11th Seanad.

Dáil	Election	Deputy (Party)	Deputy (Party)	Deputy (Party)
13th	1948	Frank Fahy (Note: As Ceann Comhairle, Frank Fahy was returned automatically in each of the two elections held in Galway South in 1948 and 1951. He rejoined the Fianna Fáil parliamentary party in 1951.) (FF)	Patrick Beegan (FF)	Robert Lahiffe (FF)
14th	1951	Frank Fahy (FF)	Patrick Beegan (FF)	Patrick Cawley (FG)
14th	1953 by-election	Robert Lahiffe (FF)	Patrick Beegan (FF)	Patrick Cawley (FG)
15th	1954	Robert Lahiffe (FF)	Patrick Beegan (FF)	Brendan Glynn (FG)
16th	1957	Michael Carty (FF)	Patrick Beegan (FF)	Brigid Hogan-O'Higgins (FG)
16th	1958 by-election	Michael Carty (FF)	Anthony Millar (FF)	Brigid Hogan-O'Higgins (FG)
17th	1961	Constituency abolished. See Galway East and Galway West		
