= 1953 Galway South by-election =

By-election to the 14th Dáil

- 21 August 1953
- Turnout: 25,162 (83.3%)
	Lahiffe	Glynn	Shields
Nominee	Robert Lahiffe	Brendan Glynn	Vincent Shields
Party	Fianna Fáil	Fine Gael	Clann na Poblachta
First preferences	13,714	8,345	2,474
Percentage	54.5%	33.2%	9.8%
TD before election
Frank Fahy
Fianna Fáil
TD after election
Robert Lahiffe
Fianna Fáil

A Dáil by-election was held in the constituency of Galway South in Ireland on Friday, 21 August 1953, to fill a vacancy in the 14th Dáil. It followed the death of Fianna Fáil Teachta Dála (TD) Frank Fahy on 12 July 1953. The writ of election to fill the vacancy was agreed by the Dáil on 31 July 1953.

The by-election was won by the Fianna Fáil candidate Robert Lahiffe.

The runner-up Brendan Glynn of Fine Gael, was elected for Galway South at the 1954 general election.

== Result ==
1953 Galway South by-election
Party	Candidate	FPv%	Count
Party	Candidate	FPv%	1
Fianna Fáil	Robert Lahiffe	54.5	13,714
Fine Gael	Brendan Glynn	33.2	8,345
Clann na Poblachta	Vincent Shields	9.8	2,474
Clann na Talmhan	Thomas McNamara	2.5	629
Electorate: 30,209 Valid: 25,162 Quota: 12,582 Turnout: 83.3%
