= Galway South =

Galway South or South Galway may refer to one of two parliamentary constituencies in County Galway, Ireland:

- Galway South (Dáil constituency) (1948–1961)
- South Galway (UK Parliament constituency) (1885–1922)
