= 1953 Cork East by-election =

By-election to the 14th Dáil

- 18 June 1953
- Turnout: 29,204 (78.8%)
	Barry	Moher	Keane, Jnr
Nominee	Richard Barry	John Moher	Seán Keane, Jnr
Party	Fine Gael	Fianna Fáil	Labour
First preferences	12,479	11,823	4,902
Percentage	42.8%	40.4%	16.8%
Final count	15,761	12,784	–
TD before election
Seán Keane
Labour
TD after election
Richard Barry
Fine Gael

A Dáil by-election was held in the constituency of Cork East in Ireland on Thursday, 18 June 1953, to fill a vacancy in the 14th Dáil. It followed the death of Labour Teachta Dála (TD) Seán Keane on 29 March 1953. The writ of election to fill the vacancy was agreed by the Dáil on 27 May 1953.

The by-election was won by the Fine Gael candidate Richard Barry.

It was held on the same day as the 1953 Wicklow by-election. Both by-elections were won by Fine Gael candidates. The runner-up John Moher of Fianna Fáil, was elected for Cork East at the 1954 general election.

== Result ==
1953 Cork East by-election
Party	Candidate	FPv%	Count	
Party	Candidate	FPv%	1	2
Fine Gael	Richard Barry	42.8	12,479	15,761
Fianna Fáil	John Moher	40.4	11,823	12,784
Labour	Seán Keane, Jnr	16.8	4,902	
Electorate: 37,057 Valid: 29,204 Quota: 14,603 Turnout: 78.8%
