= 1953 Wicklow by-election =

By-election to the 14th Dáil

- 18 June 1953
- Turnout: 27,897 (74.5%)
	Deering	Brennan	McCrea
Nominee	Mark Deering	Paudge Brennan	James J. McCrea
Party	Fine Gael	Fianna Fáil	Labour
First preferences	6,433	7,788	6,915
Percentage	23.1%	27.9%	24.8%
Final count	14,672	10,852	–
TD before election
Thomas Brennan
Fianna Fáil
TD after election
Mark Deering
Fine Gael

A Dáil by-election was held in the constituency of Wicklow in Ireland on Thursday, 18 June 1953, to fill a vacancy in the 14th Dáil. It followed the death of Fianna Fáil Teachta Dála (TD) Thomas Brennan on 22 January 1953.

The writ of election to fill the vacancy was agreed by the Dáil on 27 May 1953.

The by-election was won by the Fine Gael candidate Mark Deering. It was held on the same day as the 1953 Cork East by-election. Both by-elections were won by Fine Gael candidates.

The runner-up Paudge Brennan of Fianna Fáil, was elected for Wicklow at the 1954 general election.

== Result ==
1953 Wicklow by-election
Party	Candidate	FPv%	Count				
Party	Candidate	FPv%	1	2	3	4	5
Fianna Fáil	Paudge Brennan	27.9	7,788	8,314	9,261	9,630	10,852
Labour	James J. McCrea	24.8	6,915	7,020	7,537	8,792	
Fine Gael	Mark Deering	23.1	6,433	7,382	7,607	8,833	14,672
Clann na Poblachta	William Clarke	9.2	2,568	2,804	3,125		
Independent	William Lawless	7.8	2,164	2,256			
Independent	Elizabeth Bobbett	7.3	2,029				
Electorate: 37,470 Valid: 27,897 Quota: 13,949 Turnout: 74.5%
