= 1958 Galway South by-election =

By-election to the 16th Dáil

- 30 May 1958
- Turnout: 21,578 (75.6%)
	Millar	Clarke	Mac Ualtair
Nominee	Anthony Millar	Frank Clarke	Murchadh Mac Ualtair
Party	Fianna Fáil	Fine Gael	Sinn Féin
First preferences	11,552	6,268	3,758
Percentage	53.5%	29.1%	17.4%
TD before election
Patrick Beegan
Fianna Fáil
TD after election
Anthony Millar
Fianna Fáil

A Dáil by-election was held in the constituency of Galway South in Ireland on Friday, 30 May 1958, to fill a vacancy in the 16th Dáil. It followed the death of Fianna Fáil Teachta Dála (TD) Patrick Beegan on 2 February 1958.

The writ of election to fill the vacancy was agreed by the Dáil on 6 May 1958.

The by-election was won by the Fianna Fáil candidate Anthony Millar, nephew of the deceased TD, Patrick Beegan.

== Result ==
1958 Galway South by-election
Party	Candidate	FPv%	Count
Party	Candidate	FPv%	1
Fianna Fáil	Anthony Millar	53.5	11,552
Fine Gael	Frank Clarke	29.1	6,268
Sinn Féin	Murchadh Mac Ualtair	17.4	3,758
Electorate: 28,546 Valid: 21,578 Quota: 10,790 Turnout: 75.6%
