= 1954 Cork Borough by-election =

By-election to the 14th Dáil

- 3 March 1954
- Turnout: 39,113 (61.8%)
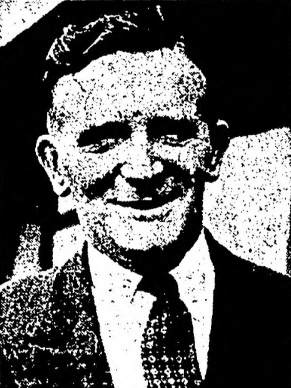
		Fitzgerald	Casey
Nominee	Stephen Barrett	Séamus Fitzgerald	Seán Casey
Party	Fine Gael	Fianna Fáil	Labour
First preferences	17,332	15,379	6,402
Percentage	44.3%	39.3%	16.4%
Final count	21,322	16,586	–
TD before election
Thomas F. O'Higgins
Fine Gael
TD after election
Stephen Barrett
Fine Gael

A Dáil by-election was held in the constituency of Cork Borough in Ireland on Wednesday, 3 March 1954, to fill a vacancy in the 14th Dáil. It followed the death of Fine Gael Teachta Dála (TD) Thomas F. O'Higgins on 1 November 1953. The writ of election to fill the vacancy was agreed by the Dáil on 10 February 1954.

The by-election was won by the Fine Gael candidate Stephen Barrett. It was held on the same day as the 1954 Louth by-election. Both by-elections were won by Fine Gael candidates.

== Result ==
1954 Cork Borough by-election
Party	Candidate	FPv%	Count	
Party	Candidate	FPv%	1	2
Fine Gael	Stephen Barrett	44.3	17,332	21,322
Fianna Fáil	Séamus Fitzgerald	39.3	15,379	16,586
Labour	Seán Casey	16.4	6,402	
Electorate: 63,322 Valid: 39,113 Quota: 19,557 Turnout: 61.8%
