= Brendan Glynn =

Irish politician (1910–1986)

Teachta Dála
- In office May 1954 – March 1957
- Constituency: Galway South

Personal details
- Born: 6 January 1910 County Galway, Ireland
- Died: 10 July 1986 (aged 76) County Galway, Ireland
- Party: Fine Gael
- Education: Garbally College

Brendan M. Glynn (6 January 1910 – 10 July 1986) was an Irish Fine Gael politician and solicitor who served as a Teachta Dála (TD), representing the Galway South constituency in Dáil Éireann. He was educated at Garbally College, County Galway. Glynn served one term following the 1954 general election, having previously unsuccessfully contested the Galway South by-election in August 1953. He did not stand at the 1957 general election.

| Dáil | Election | Deputy (Party) | Deputy (Party) | Deputy (Party) |
|---|---|---|---|---|
| 13th | 1948 | Frank Fahy (Note: As Ceann Comhairle, Frank Fahy was returned automatically in each of the two elections held in Galway South in 1948 and 1951. He rejoined the Fianna Fáil parliamentary party in 1951.) (FF) | Patrick Beegan (FF) | Robert Lahiffe (FF) |
| 14th | 1951 | Frank Fahy (FF) | Patrick Beegan (FF) | Patrick Cawley (FG) |
| 14th | 1953 by-election | Robert Lahiffe (FF) | Patrick Beegan (FF) | Patrick Cawley (FG) |
| 15th | 1954 | Robert Lahiffe (FF) | Patrick Beegan (FF) | Brendan Glynn (FG) |
| 16th | 1957 | Michael Carty (FF) | Patrick Beegan (FF) | Brigid Hogan-O'Higgins (FG) |
| 16th | 1958 by-election | Michael Carty (FF) | Anthony Millar (FF) | Brigid Hogan-O'Higgins (FG) |
| 17th | 1961 | Constituency abolished. See Galway East and Galway West | | |
