= Anthony Millar =

Irish politician (1934–1993)

Teachta Dála
- In office October 1961 – June 1969
- Constituency: Galway East
- In office May 1958 – October 1961
- Constituency: Galway South

Personal details
- Born: 24 September 1934 County Roscommon, Ireland
- Died: 23 January 1993 (aged 58)
- Party: Fianna Fáil
- Relatives: Patrick Beegan (uncle); Michael Reddy (granduncle)

Anthony G. Millar (24 September 1934 – 23 January 1993) was an Irish Fianna Fáil politician.

Millar was born in Ballydangan, County Roscommon, to Patrick Millar and Mary Beegan. A brother of his paternal grandmother was Michael Reddy, Irish Parliamentary Party MP for Birr from 1900 to 1918.

He was elected to Dáil Éireann as a Fianna Fáil Teachta Dála (TD) for the Galway South constituency at the 1958 by-election caused by the death of Patrick Beegan of Fianna Fáil, who was his uncle.

He was re-elected at the 1961 and 1965 general elections for the Galway East constituency. He did not contest the 1969 general election.

Honorary titles
Preceded by Brigid Hogan	Baby of the Dáil; 1958–1961	Succeeded by Lorcan Allen

Dáil	Election	Deputy (Party)	Deputy (Party)	Deputy (Party)
13th	1948	Frank Fahy (Note: As Ceann Comhairle, Frank Fahy was returned automatically in each of the two elections held in Galway South in 1948 and 1951. He rejoined the Fianna Fáil parliamentary party in 1951.) (FF)	Patrick Beegan (FF)	Robert Lahiffe (FF)
14th	1951	Frank Fahy (FF)	Patrick Beegan (FF)	Patrick Cawley (FG)
14th	1953 by-election	Robert Lahiffe (FF)	Patrick Beegan (FF)	Patrick Cawley (FG)
15th	1954	Robert Lahiffe (FF)	Patrick Beegan (FF)	Brendan Glynn (FG)
16th	1957	Michael Carty (FF)	Patrick Beegan (FF)	Brigid Hogan-O'Higgins (FG)
16th	1958 by-election	Michael Carty (FF)	Anthony Millar (FF)	Brigid Hogan-O'Higgins (FG)
17th	1961	Constituency abolished. See Galway East and Galway West		

Dáil	Election	Deputy (Party)	Deputy (Party)	Deputy (Party)	Deputy (Party)
9th	1937	Frank Fahy (FF)	Mark Killilea Snr (FF)	Patrick Beegan (FF)	Seán Broderick (FG)
10th	1938	Frank Fahy (FF)	Mark Killilea Snr (FF)	Patrick Beegan (FF)	Seán Broderick (FG)
11th	1943	Frank Fahy (FF)	Mark Killilea Snr (FF)	Patrick Beegan (FF)	Michael Donnellan (CnaT)
12th	1944	Frank Fahy (FF)	Mark Killilea Snr (FF)	Patrick Beegan (FF)	Michael Donnellan (CnaT)
13th	1948	Constituency abolished. See Galway North and Galway South			

Dáil	Election	Deputy (Party)	Deputy (Party)	Deputy (Party)	Deputy (Party)	Deputy (Party)
17th	1961	Michael F. Kitt (FF)	Anthony Millar (FF)	Michael Carty (FF)	Michael Donnellan (CnaT)	Brigid Hogan-O'Higgins (FG)
17th	1964 by-election	Michael F. Kitt (FF)	Anthony Millar (FF)	Michael Carty (FF)	John Donnellan (FG)	Brigid Hogan-O'Higgins (FG)
18th	1965	Michael F. Kitt (FF)	Anthony Millar (FF)	Michael Carty (FF)	John Donnellan (FG)	Brigid Hogan-O'Higgins (FG)
19th	1969	Constituency abolished. See Galway North-East and Clare–South Galway				

Dáil	Election	Deputy (Party)	Deputy (Party)	Deputy (Party)	Deputy (Party)
21st	1977	Johnny Callanan (FF)	Thomas Hussey (FF)	Mark Killilea Jnr (FF)	John Donnellan (FG)
22nd	1981	Johnny Callanan (FF)	Michael P. Kitt (FF)	Paul Connaughton Snr (FG)	3 seats 1981–1997
23rd	1982 (Feb)	Johnny Callanan (FF)	Michael P. Kitt (FF)	Paul Connaughton Snr (FG)	3 seats 1981–1997
23rd	1982 by-election	Noel Treacy (FF)	Michael P. Kitt (FF)	Paul Connaughton Snr (FG)	3 seats 1981–1997
24th	1982 (Nov)	Noel Treacy (FF)	Michael P. Kitt (FF)	Paul Connaughton Snr (FG)	3 seats 1981–1997
25th	1987	Noel Treacy (FF)	Michael P. Kitt (FF)	Paul Connaughton Snr (FG)	3 seats 1981–1997
26th	1989	Noel Treacy (FF)	Michael P. Kitt (FF)	Paul Connaughton Snr (FG)	3 seats 1981–1997
27th	1992	Noel Treacy (FF)	Michael P. Kitt (FF)	Paul Connaughton Snr (FG)	3 seats 1981–1997
28th	1997	Noel Treacy (FF)	Michael P. Kitt (FF)	Paul Connaughton Snr (FG)	Ulick Burke (FG)
29th	2002	Noel Treacy (FF)	Joe Callanan (FF)	Paul Connaughton Snr (FG)	Paddy McHugh (Ind.)
30th	2007	Noel Treacy (FF)	Michael P. Kitt (FF)	Paul Connaughton Snr (FG)	Ulick Burke (FG)
31st	2011	Colm Keaveney (Lab)	Michael P. Kitt (FF)	Ciarán Cannon (FG)	Paul Connaughton Jnr (FG)
32nd	2016	Seán Canney (Ind.)	Anne Rabbitte (FF)	Ciarán Cannon (FG)	3 seats 2016–2024
33rd	2020	Seán Canney (Ind.)	Anne Rabbitte (FF)	Ciarán Cannon (FG)	3 seats 2016–2024
34th	2024	Seán Canney (Ind.)	Albert Dolan (FF)	Peter Roche (FG)	Louis O'Hara (SF)
