= 1952 Limerick East by-election =

By-election to the 14th Dáil

- 26 June 1952
- Turnout: 38,344 (78.7%)
	Carew	Clarke	Russell
Nominee	John Carew	Thomas Clarke	Ted Russell
Party	Fine Gael	Fianna Fáil	Clann na Poblachta
First preferences	13,130	15,964	6,465
Percentage	34.2%	41.6%	16.9%
Final count	19,749	17,337	–
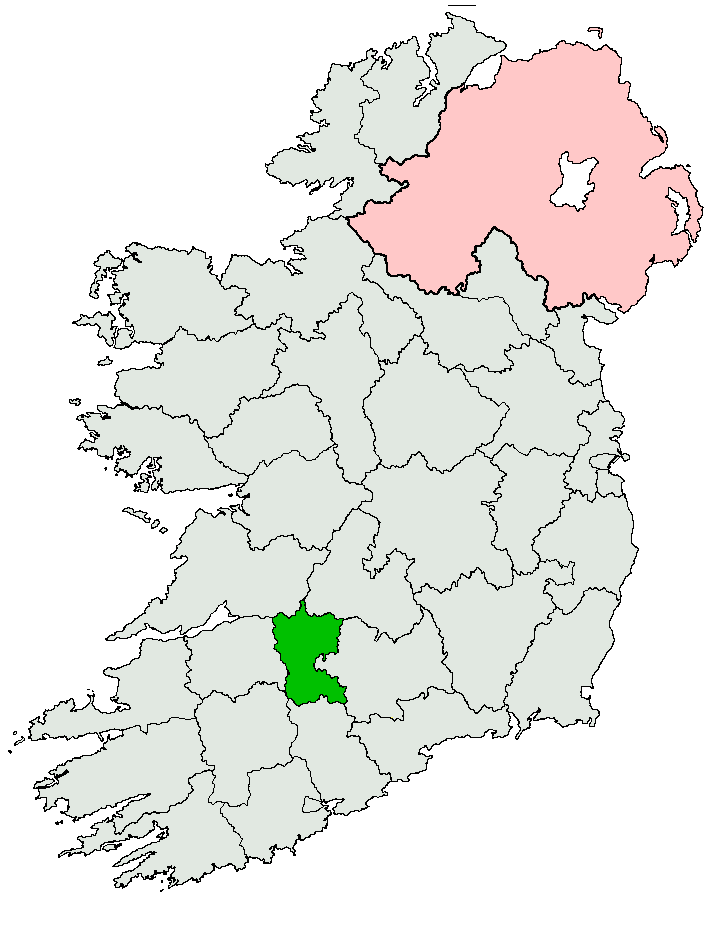
- Limerick East shown within Ireland
TD before election
Daniel Bourke
Fianna Fáil
TD after election
John Carew
Fine Gael

A Dáil by-election was held in the constituency of Limerick East in Ireland on Thursday, 26 June 1952, to fill a vacancy in the 14th Dáil. It followed the death of Fianna Fáil Teachta Dála (TD) Daniel Bourke on 13 April 1952. The writ of election to fill the vacancy was agreed by the Dáil on 5 June 1952.

The by-election was won by the Fine Gael candidate John Carew.

Two other by-elections were held on the same day; in Mayo North and Waterford.

== Result ==
1952 Limerick East by-election
Party	Candidate	FPv%	Count		
Party	Candidate	FPv%	1	2	3
Fianna Fáil	Thomas Clarke	41.6	15,964	16,546	17,337
Fine Gael	John Carew	34.2	13,130	14,120	19,749
Clann na Poblachta	Ted Russell	16.9	6,465	7,523	
Labour	John Hayes	7.3	2,785		
Electorate: 48,730 Valid: 38,344 Quota: 19,173 Turnout: 78.7%
