= John Moher =

Irish politician (1909–1985)

Teachta Dála
- In office October 1961 – April 1965
- Constituency: Cork North-East
- In office May 1954 – October 1961
- Constituency: Cork East

Personal details
- Born: 7 February 1909 County Cork, Ireland
- Died: 10 November 1985 (aged 76) County Cork, Ireland
- Party: Fianna Fáil
- Spouse: Sheila O'Neil

John W. Moher (7 February 1909 – 10 November 1985) was an Irish Fianna Fáil politician, auctioneer and farmer who was a member of Dáil Éireann representing the Cork East constituency. He was the son of William Moher and Ellen Lyons of Curraghmore, County Cork. He married Sheila O'Neil.

He was a member of the Cork County Council from 1950. Having unsuccessfully contested the 1951 general election and a 1953 by-election, Moher was elected as a Teachta Dála (TD) for the Cork East constituency at the 1954 general election and held his seat – representing the Cork North-East from 1961 – until losing it at the 1965 general election.

He was instrumental in the creation of the National Dairy Research Centre at Moorepark south of Kilworth, County Cork, and was part of the welcoming committee for the 1963 visit of U.S. President John F. Kennedy to Ireland. He opposed the destruction of Grace Castle outside of Clogheen, County Tipperary in 1960.

After his 1965 defeat, he continued to serve on the Cork County Council until 1974. He was also chairman of the Cork Hospital Board and promoted the building of the Cork Regional Hospital (now Cork University Hospital).

Dáil	Election	Deputy (Party)	Deputy (Party)	Deputy (Party)	Deputy (Party)	Deputy (Party)
4th	1923	John Daly (Ind.)	Michael Hennessy (CnaG)	David Kent (Rep)	John Dinneen (FP)	Thomas O'Mahony (CnaG)
4th	1924 by-election	John Daly (Ind.)	Michael Hennessy (CnaG)	David Kent (Rep)	John Dinneen (FP)	Michael K. Noonan (CnaG)
5th	1927 (Jun)	John Daly (Ind.)	Michael Hennessy (CnaG)	David Kent (SF)	David O'Gorman (FP)	Martin Corry (FF)
6th	1927 (Sep)	John Daly (CnaG)	Michael Hennessy (CnaG)	William Kent (FF)	Edmond Carey (CnaG)	Martin Corry (FF)
7th	1932	John Daly (CnaG)	William Broderick (CnaG)	Brook Brasier (Ind.)	Patrick Murphy (FF)	Martin Corry (FF)
8th	1933	Patrick Daly (CnaG)	William Broderick (CnaG)	William Kent (NCP)	Patrick Murphy (FF)	Martin Corry (FF)
9th	1937	Constituency abolished				

Dáil	Election	Deputy (Party)	Deputy (Party)	Deputy (Party)
13th	1948	Martin Corry (FF)	Patrick O'Gorman (FG)	Seán Keane (Lab)
14th	1951	Martin Corry (FF)	Patrick O'Gorman (FG)	Seán Keane (Lab)
14th	1953 by-election	Martin Corry (FF)	Patrick O'Gorman (FG)	Richard Barry (FG)
15th	1954	Martin Corry (FF)	John Moher (FF)	Richard Barry (FG)
16th	1957	Martin Corry (FF)	John Moher (FF)	Richard Barry (FG)
17th	1961	Constituency abolished		

Dáil	Election	Deputy (Party)	Deputy (Party)	Deputy (Party)	Deputy (Party)
22nd	1981	Carey Joyce (FF)	Myra Barry (FG)	Patrick Hegarty (FG)	Joe Sherlock (SF–WP)
23rd	1982 (Feb)	Michael Ahern (FF)	Myra Barry (FG)	Patrick Hegarty (FG)	Joe Sherlock (SF–WP)
24th	1982 (Nov)	Michael Ahern (FF)	Myra Barry (FG)	Patrick Hegarty (FG)	Ned O'Keeffe (FF)
25th	1987	Michael Ahern (FF)	Joe Sherlock (WP)	Patrick Hegarty (FG)	Ned O'Keeffe (FF)
26th	1989	Michael Ahern (FF)	Joe Sherlock (WP)	Paul Bradford (FG)	Ned O'Keeffe (FF)
27th	1992	Michael Ahern (FF)	John Mulvihill (Lab)	Paul Bradford (FG)	Ned O'Keeffe (FF)
28th	1997	Michael Ahern (FF)	David Stanton (FG)	Paul Bradford (FG)	Ned O'Keeffe (FF)
29th	2002	Michael Ahern (FF)	David Stanton (FG)	Joe Sherlock (Lab)	Ned O'Keeffe (FF)
30th	2007	Michael Ahern (FF)	David Stanton (FG)	Seán Sherlock (Lab)	Ned O'Keeffe (FF)
31st	2011	Sandra McLellan (SF)	David Stanton (FG)	Seán Sherlock (Lab)	Tom Barry (FG)
32nd	2016	Pat Buckley (SF)	David Stanton (FG)	Seán Sherlock (Lab)	Kevin O'Keeffe (FF)
33rd	2020	Pat Buckley (SF)	David Stanton (FG)	Seán Sherlock (Lab)	James O'Connor (FF)
34th	2024	Pat Buckley (SF)	Noel McCarthy (FG)	Liam Quaide (SD)	James O'Connor (FF)

Dáil	Election	Deputy (Party)	Deputy (Party)	Deputy (Party)	Deputy (Party)	Deputy (Party)
17th	1961	John Moher (FF)	Martin Corry (FF)	Philip Burton (FG)	Richard Barry (FG)	Patrick McAuliffe (Lab)
18th	1965	Jerry Cronin (FF)	Martin Corry (FF)	Philip Burton (FG)	Richard Barry (FG)	Patrick McAuliffe (Lab)
19th	1969	Jerry Cronin (FF)	Seán Brosnan (FF)	Gerard Cott (FG)	Richard Barry (FG)	4 seats 1969–1981
20th	1973	Jerry Cronin (FF)	Liam Ahern (FF)	Patrick Hegarty (FG)	Richard Barry (FG)	4 seats 1969–1981
20th	1974 by-election	Jerry Cronin (FF)	Seán Brosnan (FF)	Patrick Hegarty (FG)	Richard Barry (FG)	4 seats 1969–1981
21st	1977	Jerry Cronin (FF)	Seán Brosnan (FF)	Patrick Hegarty (FG)	Richard Barry (FG)	4 seats 1969–1981
21st	1979 by-election	Jerry Cronin (FF)	Myra Barry (FG)	Patrick Hegarty (FG)	Richard Barry (FG)	4 seats 1969–1981
22nd	1981	Constituency abolished. See Cork East and Cork North-West				
