= James Hession =

Irish politician and solicitor (1912–1999)

Teachta Dála
- In office May 1951 – March 1957
- Constituency: Galway North

Personal details
- Born: 5 November 1912 County Galway, Ireland
- Died: 12 January 1999 (aged 86) County Galway, Ireland
- Party: Fine Gael

James M. Hession (5 November 1912 – 12 January 1999) was an Irish Fine Gael politician and solicitor who served as a Teachta Dála (TD), representing the Galway North constituency in Dáil Éireann. Hession was elected at the 1951 general election, was re-elected at the 1954 general election but lost his seat at the 1957 general election.

Dáil	Election	Deputy (Party)	Deputy (Party)	Deputy (Party)
13th	1948	Mark Killilea Snr (FF)	Michael F. Kitt (FF)	Michael Donnellan (CnaT)
14th	1951	Mark Killilea Snr (FF)	James Hession (FG)	Michael Donnellan (CnaT)
15th	1954	Mark Killilea Snr (FF)	James Hession (FG)	Michael Donnellan (CnaT)
16th	1957	Mark Killilea Snr (FF)	Michael F. Kitt (FF)	Michael Donnellan (CnaT)
17th	1961	Constituency abolished. See Galway East and Galway West		
