= George Coburn =

Irish politician (1920–2009)

Teachta Dála
- In office March 1954 – October 1961
- Constituency: Louth

Personal details
- Born: 4 March 1920 County Louth, Ireland
- Died: 25 February 2009 (aged 88) County Louth, Ireland
- Party: Fine Gael
- Parent: James Coburn (father)

George Coburn (4 March 1920 – 25 February 2009) was an Irish politician. Coburn was elected to Dáil Éireann as a Fine Gael Teachta Dála (TD) for the Louth constituency at a by-election on 3 March 1954 caused by the death of his father James Coburn. He was re-elected at the 1954 and 1957 general elections. He did not contest the 1961 general election, and instead migrated to England to work as a post office official.

== See also ==
- Families in the Oireachtas

Dáil	Election	Deputy (Party)	Deputy (Party)	Deputy (Party)	Deputy (Party)	Deputy (Party)
4th	1923	Frank Aiken (Rep)	Peter Hughes (CnaG)	James Murphy (CnaG)	3 seats until 1977	
5th	1927 (Jun)	Frank Aiken (FF)	James Coburn (NL)	James Murphy (CnaG)	3 seats until 1977	
6th	1927 (Sep)	Frank Aiken (FF)	James Coburn (NL)	James Murphy (CnaG)	3 seats until 1977	
7th	1932	Frank Aiken (FF)	James Coburn (Ind.)	James Murphy (CnaG)	3 seats until 1977	
8th	1933	Frank Aiken (FF)	James Coburn (Ind.)	James Murphy (CnaG)	3 seats until 1977	
9th	1937	Frank Aiken (FF)	James Coburn (FG)	Laurence Walsh (FF)	3 seats until 1977	
10th	1938	Frank Aiken (FF)	James Coburn (FG)	Laurence Walsh (FF)	3 seats until 1977	
11th	1943	Frank Aiken (FF)	James Coburn (FG)	Roddy Connolly (Lab)	3 seats until 1977	
12th	1944	Frank Aiken (FF)	James Coburn (FG)	Laurence Walsh (FF)	3 seats until 1977	
13th	1948	Frank Aiken (FF)	James Coburn (FG)	Roddy Connolly (Lab)	3 seats until 1977	
14th	1951	Frank Aiken (FF)	James Coburn (FG)	Laurence Walsh (FF)	3 seats until 1977	
14th	1954 by-election	Frank Aiken (FF)	George Coburn (FG)	Laurence Walsh (FF)	3 seats until 1977	
15th	1954	Frank Aiken (FF)	George Coburn (FG)	Paddy Donegan (FG)	3 seats until 1977	
16th	1957	Frank Aiken (FF)	George Coburn (FG)	Pádraig Faulkner (Note: Faulker served as Ceann Comhairle in the 21st Dáil from 1977 to 1981, and was returned automatically at the 1981 election.) (FF)	3 seats until 1977	
17th	1961	Frank Aiken (FF)	Paddy Donegan (FG)	Pádraig Faulkner (FF)	3 seats until 1977	
18th	1965	Frank Aiken (FF)	Paddy Donegan (FG)	Pádraig Faulkner (FF)	3 seats until 1977	
19th	1969	Frank Aiken (FF)	Paddy Donegan (FG)	Pádraig Faulkner (FF)	3 seats until 1977	
20th	1973	Joseph Farrell (FF)	Paddy Donegan (FG)	Pádraig Faulkner (FF)	3 seats until 1977	
21st	1977	Joseph Farrell (FF)	Paddy Donegan (FG)	Pádraig Faulkner (FF)	Eddie Filgate (FF)	4 seats 1977–2011
22nd	1981	Paddy Agnew (AHB)	Bernard Markey (FG)	Pádraig Faulkner (FF)	Eddie Filgate (FF)	4 seats 1977–2011
23rd	1982 (Feb)	Thomas Bellew (FF)	Bernard Markey (FG)	Pádraig Faulkner (FF)	Eddie Filgate (FF)	4 seats 1977–2011
24th	1982 (Nov)	Michael Bell (Lab)	Brendan McGahon (FG)	Pádraig Faulkner (FF)	Séamus Kirk (Note: Kirk served as Ceann Comhairle in the 30th Dáil from 2009 to 2011, and was returned automatically at the 2011 election.) (FF)	4 seats 1977–2011
25th	1987	Michael Bell (Lab)	Brendan McGahon (FG)	Dermot Ahern (FF)	Séamus Kirk (FF)	4 seats 1977–2011
26th	1989	Michael Bell (Lab)	Brendan McGahon (FG)	Dermot Ahern (FF)	Séamus Kirk (FF)	4 seats 1977–2011
27th	1992	Michael Bell (Lab)	Brendan McGahon (FG)	Dermot Ahern (FF)	Séamus Kirk (FF)	4 seats 1977–2011
28th	1997	Michael Bell (Lab)	Brendan McGahon (FG)	Dermot Ahern (FF)	Séamus Kirk (FF)	4 seats 1977–2011
29th	2002	Arthur Morgan (SF)	Fergus O'Dowd (FG)	Dermot Ahern (FF)	Séamus Kirk (FF)	4 seats 1977–2011
30th	2007	Arthur Morgan (SF)	Fergus O'Dowd (FG)	Dermot Ahern (FF)	Séamus Kirk (FF)	4 seats 1977–2011
31st	2011	Gerry Adams (SF)	Fergus O'Dowd (FG)	Ged Nash (Lab)	Séamus Kirk (FF)	Peter Fitzpatrick (FG)
32nd	2016	Gerry Adams (SF)	Fergus O'Dowd (FG)	Declan Breathnach (FF)	Imelda Munster (SF)	Peter Fitzpatrick (FG)
33rd	2020	Ruairí Ó Murchú (SF)	Fergus O'Dowd (FG)	Ged Nash (Lab)	Imelda Munster (SF)	Peter Fitzpatrick (Ind.)
34th	2024	Ruairí Ó Murchú (SF)	Paula Butterly (FG)	Ged Nash (Lab)	Joanna Byrne (SF)	Erin McGreehan (FF)
