= James Coburn (Irish politician) =

Irish politician (1882–1953)

Teachta Dála
- In office June 1927 – 5 December 1953
- Constituency: Louth

Personal details
- Born: 31 August 1882 Dundalk, County Louth, Ireland
- Died: 5 December 1953 (aged 71) County Louth, Ireland
- Party: Fine Gael (1933–1953)
- Other political affiliations: National League (1926–1931); Independent (1931–1933)
- Spouse: Elizabeth Grant
- Children: 7, including George

James Coburn (31 August 1882 – 5 December 1953) was an Irish politician.

== Early and personal life ==
He was born 31 August 1882, one of seven children of George Coburn, a stonemason, and Bridget Coburn (née Flynn) of Camp St. (now Wolfe Tone St.), in Dundalk, County Louth. He was educated at Dundalk CBS, he became a bricklayer and after a time was promoted to foreman.

He was known as "The Juker Coburn" or "The Duker Coburn", possibly an allusion to his namesake the prizefighter Joseph Coburn, or to his shifting political allegiances. He married Elizabeth Grant, a teacher, on 26 August 1914. They had five sons and two daughters, and resided at 16 St Mary's Road, Dundalk. One of his sons was George Coburn, Fine Gael TD for Louth 1954 to 1961.

== Politics ==
He entered local politics in 1920 when he was elected to Dundalk urban district council (1920–1953) and Louth County Council (1920–1953) as a nominee of both the trade and labour council and the Irish Parliamentary Party. He first stood for election as an independent Labour candidate for the Monaghan constituency at the 1923 general election but was unsuccessful. He was first elected to Dáil Éireann as a National League Party Teachta Dála (TD) for the Louth constituency at the June 1927 general election. Following Fianna Fáil's entry into the Dáil in August 1927, Coburn proposed that the National League support the Labour Party motion of no confidence in the government. The motion failed and in the subsequent election in September 1927 the National League was reduced to only two TDs, Coburn being one of them. He became an Independent TD in July 1931 following the disbandment of the National League.

He was re-elected as an independent TD at the 1932 and 1933 general elections. He joined Fine Gael in 1933 shortly after its foundation. He was re-elected at each general election until the 1951 general election.

Coburn had sympathetic attitudes to Mussolini stating in the Dail in 1937 that "If I had a choice between Mussolini as leader, as President of the Irish Free State–if I had to make my choice as between him and the man representing Labour, that representative of sloppy sentimentalism in the form of cheap sloppy democracy, I would vote a thousand times for Mussolini. I am a trade unionist and a working man, and I know that under a man like Mussolini you will have protection and law and order and nothing will be taken by the waster from the thrifty section of the community."

He died during the 14th Dáil, and the subsequent by-election on 3 March 1954 was won by his son George Coburn.

== See also ==
- Families in the Oireachtas

Dáil	Election	Deputy (Party)	Deputy (Party)	Deputy (Party)	Deputy (Party)	Deputy (Party)
4th	1923	Frank Aiken (Rep)	Peter Hughes (CnaG)	James Murphy (CnaG)	3 seats until 1977	
5th	1927 (Jun)	Frank Aiken (FF)	James Coburn (NL)	James Murphy (CnaG)	3 seats until 1977	
6th	1927 (Sep)	Frank Aiken (FF)	James Coburn (NL)	James Murphy (CnaG)	3 seats until 1977	
7th	1932	Frank Aiken (FF)	James Coburn (Ind.)	James Murphy (CnaG)	3 seats until 1977	
8th	1933	Frank Aiken (FF)	James Coburn (Ind.)	James Murphy (CnaG)	3 seats until 1977	
9th	1937	Frank Aiken (FF)	James Coburn (FG)	Laurence Walsh (FF)	3 seats until 1977	
10th	1938	Frank Aiken (FF)	James Coburn (FG)	Laurence Walsh (FF)	3 seats until 1977	
11th	1943	Frank Aiken (FF)	James Coburn (FG)	Roddy Connolly (Lab)	3 seats until 1977	
12th	1944	Frank Aiken (FF)	James Coburn (FG)	Laurence Walsh (FF)	3 seats until 1977	
13th	1948	Frank Aiken (FF)	James Coburn (FG)	Roddy Connolly (Lab)	3 seats until 1977	
14th	1951	Frank Aiken (FF)	James Coburn (FG)	Laurence Walsh (FF)	3 seats until 1977	
14th	1954 by-election	Frank Aiken (FF)	George Coburn (FG)	Laurence Walsh (FF)	3 seats until 1977	
15th	1954	Frank Aiken (FF)	George Coburn (FG)	Paddy Donegan (FG)	3 seats until 1977	
16th	1957	Frank Aiken (FF)	George Coburn (FG)	Pádraig Faulkner (Note: Faulker served as Ceann Comhairle in the 21st Dáil from 1977 to 1981, and was returned automatically at the 1981 election.) (FF)	3 seats until 1977	
17th	1961	Frank Aiken (FF)	Paddy Donegan (FG)	Pádraig Faulkner (FF)	3 seats until 1977	
18th	1965	Frank Aiken (FF)	Paddy Donegan (FG)	Pádraig Faulkner (FF)	3 seats until 1977	
19th	1969	Frank Aiken (FF)	Paddy Donegan (FG)	Pádraig Faulkner (FF)	3 seats until 1977	
20th	1973	Joseph Farrell (FF)	Paddy Donegan (FG)	Pádraig Faulkner (FF)	3 seats until 1977	
21st	1977	Joseph Farrell (FF)	Paddy Donegan (FG)	Pádraig Faulkner (FF)	Eddie Filgate (FF)	4 seats 1977–2011
22nd	1981	Paddy Agnew (AHB)	Bernard Markey (FG)	Pádraig Faulkner (FF)	Eddie Filgate (FF)	4 seats 1977–2011
23rd	1982 (Feb)	Thomas Bellew (FF)	Bernard Markey (FG)	Pádraig Faulkner (FF)	Eddie Filgate (FF)	4 seats 1977–2011
24th	1982 (Nov)	Michael Bell (Lab)	Brendan McGahon (FG)	Pádraig Faulkner (FF)	Séamus Kirk (Note: Kirk served as Ceann Comhairle in the 30th Dáil from 2009 to 2011, and was returned automatically at the 2011 election.) (FF)	4 seats 1977–2011
25th	1987	Michael Bell (Lab)	Brendan McGahon (FG)	Dermot Ahern (FF)	Séamus Kirk (FF)	4 seats 1977–2011
26th	1989	Michael Bell (Lab)	Brendan McGahon (FG)	Dermot Ahern (FF)	Séamus Kirk (FF)	4 seats 1977–2011
27th	1992	Michael Bell (Lab)	Brendan McGahon (FG)	Dermot Ahern (FF)	Séamus Kirk (FF)	4 seats 1977–2011
28th	1997	Michael Bell (Lab)	Brendan McGahon (FG)	Dermot Ahern (FF)	Séamus Kirk (FF)	4 seats 1977–2011
29th	2002	Arthur Morgan (SF)	Fergus O'Dowd (FG)	Dermot Ahern (FF)	Séamus Kirk (FF)	4 seats 1977–2011
30th	2007	Arthur Morgan (SF)	Fergus O'Dowd (FG)	Dermot Ahern (FF)	Séamus Kirk (FF)	4 seats 1977–2011
31st	2011	Gerry Adams (SF)	Fergus O'Dowd (FG)	Ged Nash (Lab)	Séamus Kirk (FF)	Peter Fitzpatrick (FG)
32nd	2016	Gerry Adams (SF)	Fergus O'Dowd (FG)	Declan Breathnach (FF)	Imelda Munster (SF)	Peter Fitzpatrick (FG)
33rd	2020	Ruairí Ó Murchú (SF)	Fergus O'Dowd (FG)	Ged Nash (Lab)	Imelda Munster (SF)	Peter Fitzpatrick (Ind.)
34th	2024	Ruairí Ó Murchú (SF)	Paula Butterly (FG)	Ged Nash (Lab)	Joanna Byrne (SF)	Erin McGreehan (FF)
