= 1954 Louth by-election =

By-election to the 14th Dáil

- 3 March 1954
- Turnout: 30,789 (73.4%)
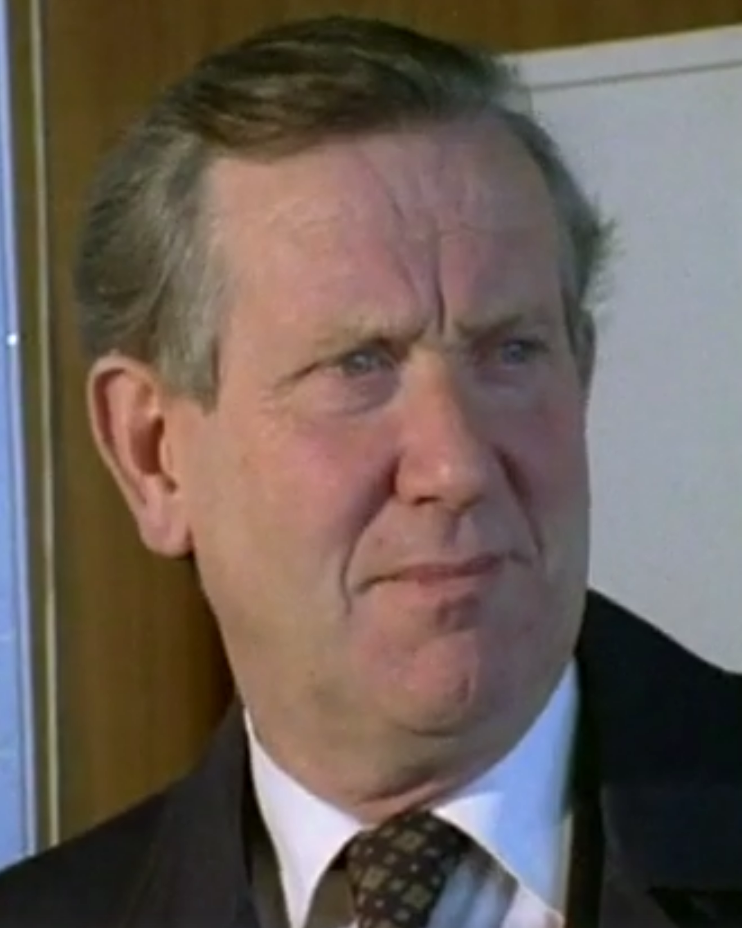
	Coburn		Connolly
Nominee	George Coburn	Pádraig Faulkner	Roddy Connolly
Party	Fine Gael	Fianna Fáil	Labour
First preferences	13,360	12,531	3,452
Percentage	43.4%	40.7%	11.2%
Final count	16,459	13,432	–
TD before election
James Coburn
Fine Gael
TD after election
George Coburn
Fine Gael

A Dáil by-election was held in the constituency of Louth in Ireland on Wednesday, 3 March 1954, to fill a vacancy in the 14th Dáil. It followed the death of Fine Gael Teachta Dála (TD) James Coburn on 5 December 1953. The writ of election to fill the vacancy was agreed by the Dáil on 10 February 1954.

The by-election was won by the Fine Gael candidate George Coburn, son of the deceased TD, James Coburn. It was held on the same day as the 1954 Cork Borough by-election. Both by-elections were won by Fine Gael candidates.

== Result ==
1954 Louth by-election
Party	Candidate	FPv%	Count		
Party	Candidate	FPv%	1	2	3
Fine Gael	George Coburn	43.4	13,360	13,817	16,459
Fianna Fáil	Pádraig Faulkner	40.7	12,531	12,801	13,432
Labour	Roddy Connolly	11.2	3,452	3,952	
Sinn Féin	Joseph Campbell	4.7	1,446		
Electorate: 41,975 Valid: 30,789 Quota: 15,395 Turnout: 73.4%
