= Cappataggle =

Village in County Galway, Ireland

Coordinates: 53°17′N 8°24′W

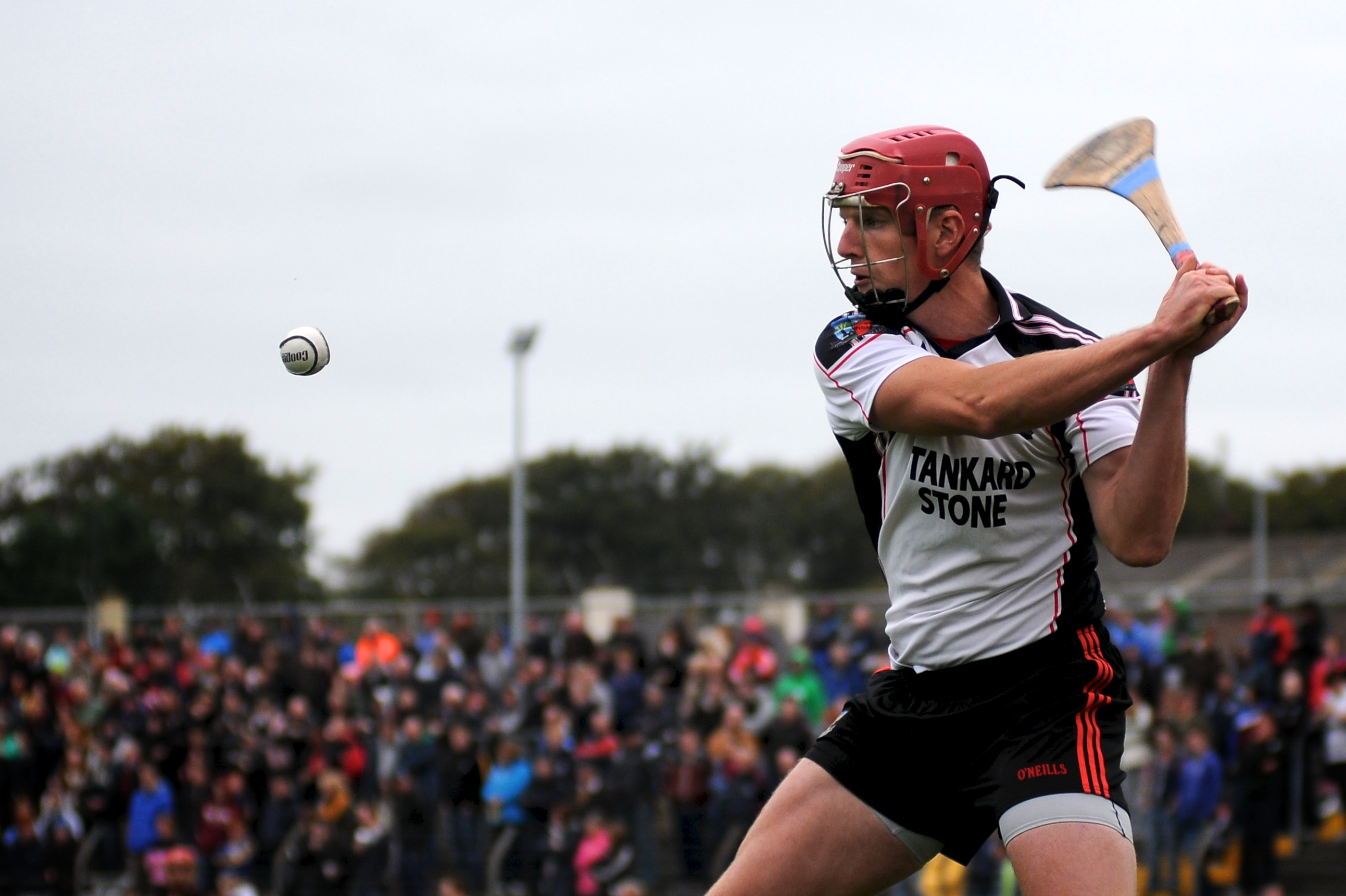
Cappataggle HC player

Cappataggle (Irish: Ceapach an tSeagail) is a village located between the towns of Loughrea and Ballinasloe in east County Galway. With the areas Kilrickle and Killalaghton it forms an ecclesiastical parish of the same name. The name Cappataggle is an anglicisation of the Irish name Ceapach an tSeagail, which translates as ‘meadow of rye’. The village is centred on many dairy, livestock and tillage farms. The new M6 Galway to Dublin motorway toll plaza is located a half km from the village.

The village itself is rather small consisting of a hamlet of houses, a public house, St Michael’s Catholic church, community centre, national school and sports field. There is another community hall located in Killalaghton which is situated 5 km south of the village.

The local hurling club, based in the village, plays in black and red coloured jerseys. Players and supporters also come from the neighbouring villages of Aughrim, Kilconnell and Kilrickle. Gaelic football is played with St Gabriel’s in Kilconnell.
