= Michael Carty =

Irish politician (1916–1975)

Parliamentary Secretary
- 1965–1969: Government Chief Whip
- 1965–1969: Defence

Teachta Dála
- In office June 1969 – February 1973
- Constituency: Clare–South Galway
- In office October 1961 – June 1969
- Constituency: Galway East
- In office March 1957 – October 1961
- Constituency: Galway South

Personal details
- Born: 16 December 1916 Loughrea, Galway, Ireland
- Died: 23 April 1975 (aged 58)
- Party: Fianna Fáil

Michael Carty (16 December 1916 – 23 April 1975) was an Irish Fianna Fáil politician. Born in Loughrea, County Galway to Lawrence and Josephine Carty, he was the eldest of seven children. A schoolteacher by profession, he was elected to Dáil Éireann as a Fianna Fáil TD for the Galway South constituency at the 1957 general election. From 1961 to 1969, he represented the Galway East constituency, and from 1969 to 1973 the Clare–South Galway constituency. He retired from politics in 1973.

He served in the government of Seán Lemass on one occasion from 1965 to 1969 as Government Chief Whip, occupying the positions of Parliamentary Secretary to the Taoiseach and Parliamentary Secretary to the Minister for Defence.

Political offices
| Preceded by Joseph Brennan | Government Chief Whip; 1965–1969 | Succeeded by Desmond O'Malley |
| Preceded by Joseph Brennan | Parliamentary Secretary to the Minister for Defence; 1965–1969 | Succeeded by Desmond O'Malley |

| Dáil | Election | Deputy (Party) | Deputy (Party) | Deputy (Party) |
|---|---|---|---|---|
| 13th | 1948 | Frank Fahy (Note: As Ceann Comhairle, Frank Fahy was returned automatically in each of the two elections held in Galway South in 1948 and 1951. He rejoined the Fianna Fáil parliamentary party in 1951.) (FF) | Patrick Beegan (FF) | Robert Lahiffe (FF) |
| 14th | 1951 | Frank Fahy (FF) | Patrick Beegan (FF) | Patrick Cawley (FG) |
| 14th | 1953 by-election | Robert Lahiffe (FF) | Patrick Beegan (FF) | Patrick Cawley (FG) |
| 15th | 1954 | Robert Lahiffe (FF) | Patrick Beegan (FF) | Brendan Glynn (FG) |
| 16th | 1957 | Michael Carty (FF) | Patrick Beegan (FF) | Brigid Hogan-O'Higgins (FG) |
| 16th | 1958 by-election | Michael Carty (FF) | Anthony Millar (FF) | Brigid Hogan-O'Higgins (FG) |
| 17th | 1961 | Constituency abolished. See Galway East and Galway West | | |

| Dáil | Election | Deputy (Party) | Deputy (Party) | Deputy (Party) | Deputy (Party) |
|---|---|---|---|---|---|
| 9th | 1937 | Frank Fahy (FF) | Mark Killilea Snr (FF) | Patrick Beegan (FF) | Seán Broderick (FG) |
| 10th | 1938 | Frank Fahy (FF) | Mark Killilea Snr (FF) | Patrick Beegan (FF) | Seán Broderick (FG) |
| 11th | 1943 | Frank Fahy (FF) | Mark Killilea Snr (FF) | Patrick Beegan (FF) | Michael Donnellan (CnaT) |
| 12th | 1944 | Frank Fahy (FF) | Mark Killilea Snr (FF) | Patrick Beegan (FF) | Michael Donnellan (CnaT) |
| 13th | 1948 | Constituency abolished. See Galway North and Galway South | | | |

| Dáil | Election | Deputy (Party) | Deputy (Party) | Deputy (Party) | Deputy (Party) | Deputy (Party) |
|---|---|---|---|---|---|---|
| 17th | 1961 | Michael F. Kitt (FF) | Anthony Millar (FF) | Michael Carty (FF) | Michael Donnellan (CnaT) | Brigid Hogan-O'Higgins (FG) |
| 17th | 1964 by-election | Michael F. Kitt (FF) | Anthony Millar (FF) | Michael Carty (FF) | John Donnellan (FG) | Brigid Hogan-O'Higgins (FG) |
| 18th | 1965 | Michael F. Kitt (FF) | Anthony Millar (FF) | Michael Carty (FF) | John Donnellan (FG) | Brigid Hogan-O'Higgins (FG) |
| 19th | 1969 | Constituency abolished. See Galway North-East and Clare–South Galway | | | | |

| Dáil | Election | Deputy (Party) | Deputy (Party) | Deputy (Party) | Deputy (Party) |
|---|---|---|---|---|---|
| 21st | 1977 | Johnny Callanan (FF) | Thomas Hussey (FF) | Mark Killilea Jnr (FF) | John Donnellan (FG) |
| 22nd | 1981 | Johnny Callanan (FF) | Michael P. Kitt (FF) | Paul Connaughton Snr (FG) | 3 seats 1981–1997 |
| 23rd | 1982 (Feb) | Johnny Callanan (FF) | Michael P. Kitt (FF) | Paul Connaughton Snr (FG) | 3 seats 1981–1997 |
| 23rd | 1982 by-election | Noel Treacy (FF) | Michael P. Kitt (FF) | Paul Connaughton Snr (FG) | 3 seats 1981–1997 |
| 24th | 1982 (Nov) | Noel Treacy (FF) | Michael P. Kitt (FF) | Paul Connaughton Snr (FG) | 3 seats 1981–1997 |
| 25th | 1987 | Noel Treacy (FF) | Michael P. Kitt (FF) | Paul Connaughton Snr (FG) | 3 seats 1981–1997 |
| 26th | 1989 | Noel Treacy (FF) | Michael P. Kitt (FF) | Paul Connaughton Snr (FG) | 3 seats 1981–1997 |
| 27th | 1992 | Noel Treacy (FF) | Michael P. Kitt (FF) | Paul Connaughton Snr (FG) | 3 seats 1981–1997 |
| 28th | 1997 | Noel Treacy (FF) | Michael P. Kitt (FF) | Paul Connaughton Snr (FG) | Ulick Burke (FG) |
| 29th | 2002 | Noel Treacy (FF) | Joe Callanan (FF) | Paul Connaughton Snr (FG) | Paddy McHugh (Ind.) |
| 30th | 2007 | Noel Treacy (FF) | Michael P. Kitt (FF) | Paul Connaughton Snr (FG) | Ulick Burke (FG) |
| 31st | 2011 | Colm Keaveney (Lab) | Michael P. Kitt (FF) | Ciarán Cannon (FG) | Paul Connaughton Jnr (FG) |
| 32nd | 2016 | Seán Canney (Ind.) | Anne Rabbitte (FF) | Ciarán Cannon (FG) | 3 seats 2016–2024 |
| 33rd | 2020 | Seán Canney (Ind.) | Anne Rabbitte (FF) | Ciarán Cannon (FG) | 3 seats 2016–2024 |
| 34th | 2024 | Seán Canney (Ind.) | Albert Dolan (FF) | Peter Roche (FG) | Louis O'Hara (SF) |

| Dáil | Election | Deputy (Party) | Deputy (Party) | Deputy (Party) |
|---|---|---|---|---|
| 19th | 1969 | Bill Loughnane (FF) | Michael Carty (FF) | Brigid Hogan-O'Higgins (FG) |
| 20th | 1973 | Bill Loughnane (FF) | Johnny Callanan (FF) | Brigid Hogan-O'Higgins (FG) |
| 21st | 1977 | Constituency abolished. See Galway East, Galway West and Clare | | |
