= Galway South (Dáil constituency) =

Dáil constituency (1948–1961)

- Former Dáil constituency

Former constituency
- Created: 1948
- Abolished: 1961
- Seats: 3
- Local government area: County Galway
- Created from: Galway East; Galway West
- Replaced by: Galway East; Galway West

Galway South was a parliamentary constituency represented in Dáil Éireann, the lower house of the Irish parliament or Oireachtas from 1948 to 1961. The constituency elected 3 deputies (Teachtaí Dála, commonly known as TDs) to the Dáil, on the system of proportional representation by means of the single transferable vote (PR-STV).

== History ==
The constituency was created under the Electoral (Amendment) Act 1947 for the 1948 general election to Dáil Éireann. It was abolished under the Electoral (Amendment) Act 1961, when it was partially replaced by the new constituency of Galway East.

== Boundaries ==
The constituency comprised the district electoral divisions of:

"Ardamullivan, Ardrahan, Ballycahalan, Beagh, Cahermore, Cappard, Castletaylor, Doorus, Drumacoo, Gort, Kilbeacanty, Killeely, Killeenavarra, Killinny, Kiltartan, Kilthomas, Kinvara, Rahasane, Skehanagh, Aille, Athenry, Ballynagar, Bracklagh, Bullaun, Cappalusk, Castleboy, Cloonkeen, Colmanstown, Craughwell, Derrylaur, Drumkeary, Graigabbey, Grange, Greethin, Kilchreest, Kilconickny, Kilconierin, Killimor, Killogilleen, Kilmeen, Kilreekill, Kilteskill, Kiltullagh, Lackalea, Leitrim, Loughatorick, Loughrea Rural, Loughrea Urban, Marblehill, Mountain, Moyode, Raford, Tiaquin, Woodford, Abbeygormacan, Ahascragh, Aughrim, Ballinasloe Rural, Ballymacward Clonfert, Clontuskert, Kellysgrove, Kilconnell, Killaan, Killallaghtan, Killoran, Killure, Kilmacshane, Kiltormer, Kylemore, Lawrencestown, Lismanny, Oatfield, Abbeyville, Ballyglass, Coos, Derrew, Drummin, Eyrecourt, Killimor, Kilmalinoge, Kilquain, Meelick, Moat, Pallas, Portumna, Tiranascragh, Tynagh, Ballynacourty, Clarinbridge, Oranmore, Stradbally; and the urban district of Ballinasloe."

== TDs ==
Teachtaí Dála (TDs) for Galway South 1948–1961
Key to parties: FF = Fianna Fáil; FG = Fine Gael
Dáil	Election	Deputy (Party)	Deputy (Party)	Deputy (Party)
13th	1948	Frank Fahy (Note: As Ceann Comhairle, Frank Fahy was returned automatically in each of the two elections held in Galway South in 1948 and 1951. He rejoined the Fianna Fáil parliamentary party in 1951.) (FF)	Patrick Beegan (FF)	Robert Lahiffe (FF)
14th	1951	Frank Fahy (FF)	Patrick Beegan (FF)	Patrick Cawley (FG)
14th	1953 by-election	Robert Lahiffe (FF)	Patrick Beegan (FF)	Patrick Cawley (FG)
15th	1954	Robert Lahiffe (FF)	Patrick Beegan (FF)	Brendan Glynn (FG)
16th	1957	Michael Carty (FF)	Patrick Beegan (FF)	Brigid Hogan-O'Higgins (FG)
16th	1958 by-election	Michael Carty (FF)	Anthony Millar (FF)	Brigid Hogan-O'Higgins (FG)
17th	1961	Constituency abolished. See Galway East and Galway West		

Note: The columns in this table are used only for presentational purposes, and no significance should be attached to the order of columns. For details of the order in which seats were won at each election, see the detailed results of that election.

== Elections ==
*: Outgoing TD

=== 1958 by-election ===
Following the death of Fianna Fáil TD Patrick Beegan, a by-election was held on 30 May 1958. The seat was won by the Fianna Fáil candidate Anthony Millar.

1958 by-election: Galway South
Party	Candidate	FPv%	Count
Party	Candidate	FPv%	1
Fianna Fáil	Anthony Millar	53.5	11,552
Fine Gael	Frank Clarke	29.1	6,268
Sinn Féin	Murchadh Mac Ualtair	17.4	3,758
Electorate: 28,546 Valid: 21,578 Quota: 10,790 Turnout: 75.6%

=== 1957 general election ===
1957 general election: Galway South
Party	Candidate	FPv%	Count				
Party	Candidate	FPv%	1	2	3	4	5
Fianna Fáil	Patrick Beegan	29.1	6,537				
Fine Gael	Brigid Hogan	20.1	4,530	4,570	5,691		
Fianna Fáil	Michael Carty	17.5	3,944	4,555	4,641	4,649	5,045
Fianna Fáil	Robert Lahiffe	17.1	3,856	4,091	4,279	4,288	4,577
Sinn Féin	Murchadh MacUaltair	9.3	2,086	2,103	2,197	2,246	
Fine Gael	Joseph Lambert	6.9	1,545	1,554			
Electorate: 29,329 Valid: 22,498 Quota: 5,625 Turnout: 76.7%

=== 1954 general election ===
1954 general election: Galway South
Party	Candidate	FPv%	Count		
Party	Candidate	FPv%	1	2	3
Fianna Fáil	Patrick Beegan	34.9	8,291		
Fine Gael	Brendan Glynn	23.1	5,476	5,560	5,634
Fianna Fáil	Robert Lahiffe	22.6	5,373	7,499	
Fine Gael	Patrick Cawley	11.3	2,692	2,804	2,855
Clann na Poblachta	Vincent Shields	8.0	1,904	1,938	2,018
Electorate: 30,053 Valid: 23,736 Quota: 5,935 Turnout: 79.0%

=== 1953 by-election ===
Following the death of Fianna Fáil TD Frank Fahy, a by-election was held on 21 August 1953. The seat was won by the Fianna Fáil candidate Robert Lahiffe.

1953 by-election: Galway South
Party	Candidate	FPv%	Count
Party	Candidate	FPv%	1
Fianna Fáil	Robert Lahiffe	54.5	13,714
Fine Gael	Brendan Glynn	33.2	8,345
Clann na Poblachta	Vincent Shields	9.8	2,474
Clann na Talmhan	Thomas McNamara	2.5	629
Electorate: 30,209 Valid: 25,162 Quota: 12,582 Turnout: 83.3%

=== 1951 general election ===
1951 general election: Galway South
Party	Candidate	FPv%	Count		
Party	Candidate	FPv%	1	2	3
Fianna Fáil	Frank Fahy (Note: As outgoing Ceann Comhairle, Fahy was returned automatically under Art. 16.6 of the Constitution and the Electoral (Chairman of Dáil Éireann) Act 1937.)	N/A	Returned automatically		
Fianna Fáil	Patrick Beegan	30.7	7,367	7,581	7,842
Fine Gael	Patrick Cawley	28.9	6,952	9,685	
Fianna Fáil	Robert Lahiffe	26.1	6,268	6,486	6,609
Clann na Poblachta	Vincent Shields	14.3	3,437		
Electorate: 30,369 Valid: 24,024 Quota: 8,009 Turnout: 79.1%

=== 1948 general election ===
1948 general election: Galway South
Party	Candidate	FPv%	Count			
Party	Candidate	FPv%	1	2	3	4
Fianna Fáil	Frank Fahy (Note: As outgoing Ceann Comhairle, Fahy was returned automatically under Art. 16.6 of the Constitution and the Electoral (Chairman of Dáil Éireann) Act 1937, as adapted by the Electoral (Amendment) Act 1947. He was elected again as Ceann Comhairle on 18 February 1948, leaving the Fianna Fáil parliamentary party.)	N/A	Returned automatically			
Fianna Fáil	Patrick Beegan	48.4	11,080			
Fine Gael	Patrick Cawley	17.0	3,886	4,248	4,343	6,069
Fianna Fáil	Robert Lahiffe	15.9	3,651	6,549	6,588	6,893
Clann na Poblachta	Vincent Shields	13.9	3,176	3,302	4,266	
Clann na Poblachta	Martin Newell	4.8	1,108	1,168		
Electorate: 30,852 Valid: 22,901 Quota: 7,634 Turnout: 74.2%

== See also ==
- Politics of the Republic of Ireland
- Historic Dáil constituencies
- Elections in the Republic of Ireland
