= Patrick Beegan =

Irish politician (1895–1958)

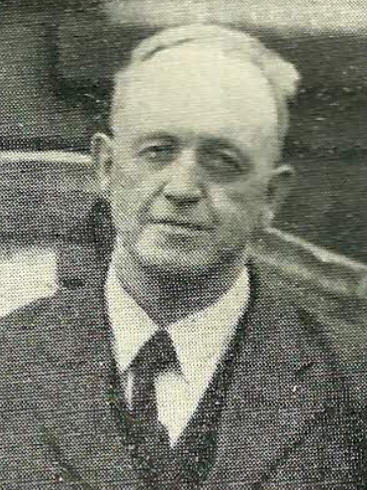
- Beegan in 1951

Parliamentary Secretary
- 1957–1958: Finance
- 1951–1954: Finance

Teachta Dála
- In office February 1948 – 2 February 1958
- Constituency: Galway South
- In office July 1937 – February 1948
- Constituency: Galway East
- In office February 1932 – July 1937
- Constituency: Galway

Personal details
- Born: 26 May 1895 Cappataggle, County Galway, Ireland
- Died: 2 February 1958 (aged 62) County Galway, Ireland
- Party: Fianna Fáil
- Relatives: Anthony Millar (nephew)
- Education: Garbally College

Patrick Beegan (26 May 1895 – 2 February 1958) was an Irish Fianna Fáil politician.

== Early life and revolutionary period ==
He was born in the townland of Oatfield, Cappataggle, County Galway, to John Beegan, a herdsman, and Mary Stephenson. Beegan claims that he was active with the Aughrim Company, Ballinasloe Battalion, Galway Brigade, Irish Volunteers from 1917. During the Irish War of Independence, Beegan took part in general Irish Republican Army (IRA) activity and claims that he was Battalion Adjutant, Battalion Vice Commandant and Battalion Commandant of 3 Battalion, 1 Brigade (Galway), 1 Western Division, IRA during the Truce period (1921–1922).

Taking the anti-Treaty side in the Irish Civil War, Beegan took part in several armed operations against National Army troops. He was captured in August 1922, interned by the Free State government, took part in a 14 days hunger strike in October 1923 and was released in November 1923. Beegan unsuccessfully applied to the Irish government for a military service pension under the Military Service Pensions Act, 1934 but was awarded a Service Medal (1917–1921) in 1944.

== Politics ==
He was first elected to Dáil Éireann at the 1932 general election when Fianna Fáil first came to power. He was re-elected for various Galway constituencies a further nine occasions. In 1951 he was appointed to the position of Parliamentary Secretary to the Minister for Finance by Éamon de Valera's government. He served in that position until 1954, and was re-appointed in 1957 when Fianna Fáil returned to power. Beegan served in that post until his death on 2 February 1958..

The subsequent by-election to fill Beegan's seat in the Galway South constituency was won by his nephew, Anthony Millar, whose mother, Mary, was Beegan's sister.

Political offices
Preceded by Michael Donnellan	Parliamentary Secretary to the Minister for Finance; 1951–1954	Succeeded by Michael Donnellan
Preceded by Michael Donnellan	Parliamentary Secretary to the Minister for Finance; 1957–1958	Succeeded by Gerald Bartley

Dáil	Election	Deputy (Party)	Deputy (Party)	Deputy (Party)	Deputy (Party)	Deputy (Party)	Deputy (Party)	Deputy (Party)	Deputy (Party)	Deputy (Party)
2nd	1921	Liam Mellows (SF)	Bryan Cusack (SF)	Frank Fahy (SF)	Joseph Whelehan (SF)	Pádraic Ó Máille (SF)	George Nicolls (SF)	Patrick Hogan (SF)	7 seats 1921–1923	
3rd	1922	Thomas O'Connell (Lab)	Bryan Cusack (AT-SF)	Frank Fahy (AT-SF)	Joseph Whelehan (PT-SF)	Pádraic Ó Máille (PT-SF)	George Nicolls (PT-SF)	Patrick Hogan (PT-SF)	7 seats 1921–1923	
4th	1923	Thomas O'Connell (Lab)	Barney Mellows (Rep)	Frank Fahy (Rep)	Louis O'Dea (Rep)	Pádraic Ó Máille (CnaG)	George Nicolls (CnaG)	Patrick Hogan (CnaG)	Seán Broderick (CnaG)	James Cosgrave (Ind.)
5th	1927 (Jun)	Gilbert Lynch (Lab)	Thomas Powell (FF)	Frank Fahy (Note: Frank Fahy served as Ceann Comhairle from 9 March 1932.) (FF)	Seán Tubridy (FF)	Mark Killilea Snr (FF)	Martin McDonogh (CnaG)	Patrick Hogan (CnaG)	Seán Broderick (CnaG)	William Duffy (NL)
6th	1927 (Sep)	Stephen Jordan (FF)	Thomas Powell (FF)	Frank Fahy (FF)	Seán Tubridy (FF)	Mark Killilea Snr (FF)	Martin McDonogh (CnaG)	Patrick Hogan (CnaG)	Seán Broderick (CnaG)	Joseph Mongan (CnaG)
7th	1932	Stephen Jordan (FF)	Thomas Powell (FF)	Frank Fahy (FF)	Patrick Beegan (FF)	Gerald Bartley (FF)	Fred McDonogh (CnaG)	Patrick Hogan (CnaG)	Seán Broderick (CnaG)	Joseph Mongan (CnaG)
8th	1933	Stephen Jordan (FF)	Mark Killilea Snr (FF)	Frank Fahy (FF)	Patrick Beegan (FF)	Gerald Bartley (FF)	Séamus Keely (FF)	Patrick Hogan (CnaG)	Seán Broderick (CnaG)	Martin McDonogh (CnaG)
8th	1935 by-election	Stephen Jordan (FF)	Mark Killilea Snr (FF)	Frank Fahy (FF)	Patrick Beegan (FF)	Gerald Bartley (FF)	Séamus Keely (FF)	Patrick Hogan (CnaG)	Seán Broderick (CnaG)	Eamon Corbett (FF)
8th	1936 by-election	Stephen Jordan (FF)	Mark Killilea Snr (FF)	Frank Fahy (FF)	Patrick Beegan (FF)	Gerald Bartley (FF)	Séamus Keely (FF)	Martin Neilan (FF)	Seán Broderick (CnaG)	Eamon Corbett (FF)
9th	1937	Constituency abolished. See Galway East and Galway West								

Dáil	Election	Deputy (Party)	Deputy (Party)	Deputy (Party)	Deputy (Party)
9th	1937	Frank Fahy (FF)	Mark Killilea Snr (FF)	Patrick Beegan (FF)	Seán Broderick (FG)
10th	1938	Frank Fahy (FF)	Mark Killilea Snr (FF)	Patrick Beegan (FF)	Seán Broderick (FG)
11th	1943	Frank Fahy (FF)	Mark Killilea Snr (FF)	Patrick Beegan (FF)	Michael Donnellan (CnaT)
12th	1944	Frank Fahy (FF)	Mark Killilea Snr (FF)	Patrick Beegan (FF)	Michael Donnellan (CnaT)
13th	1948	Constituency abolished. See Galway North and Galway South			

Dáil	Election	Deputy (Party)	Deputy (Party)	Deputy (Party)	Deputy (Party)	Deputy (Party)
17th	1961	Michael F. Kitt (FF)	Anthony Millar (FF)	Michael Carty (FF)	Michael Donnellan (CnaT)	Brigid Hogan-O'Higgins (FG)
17th	1964 by-election	Michael F. Kitt (FF)	Anthony Millar (FF)	Michael Carty (FF)	John Donnellan (FG)	Brigid Hogan-O'Higgins (FG)
18th	1965	Michael F. Kitt (FF)	Anthony Millar (FF)	Michael Carty (FF)	John Donnellan (FG)	Brigid Hogan-O'Higgins (FG)
19th	1969	Constituency abolished. See Galway North-East and Clare–South Galway				

Dáil	Election	Deputy (Party)	Deputy (Party)	Deputy (Party)	Deputy (Party)
21st	1977	Johnny Callanan (FF)	Thomas Hussey (FF)	Mark Killilea Jnr (FF)	John Donnellan (FG)
22nd	1981	Johnny Callanan (FF)	Michael P. Kitt (FF)	Paul Connaughton Snr (FG)	3 seats 1981–1997
23rd	1982 (Feb)	Johnny Callanan (FF)	Michael P. Kitt (FF)	Paul Connaughton Snr (FG)	3 seats 1981–1997
23rd	1982 by-election	Noel Treacy (FF)	Michael P. Kitt (FF)	Paul Connaughton Snr (FG)	3 seats 1981–1997
24th	1982 (Nov)	Noel Treacy (FF)	Michael P. Kitt (FF)	Paul Connaughton Snr (FG)	3 seats 1981–1997
25th	1987	Noel Treacy (FF)	Michael P. Kitt (FF)	Paul Connaughton Snr (FG)	3 seats 1981–1997
26th	1989	Noel Treacy (FF)	Michael P. Kitt (FF)	Paul Connaughton Snr (FG)	3 seats 1981–1997
27th	1992	Noel Treacy (FF)	Michael P. Kitt (FF)	Paul Connaughton Snr (FG)	3 seats 1981–1997
28th	1997	Noel Treacy (FF)	Michael P. Kitt (FF)	Paul Connaughton Snr (FG)	Ulick Burke (FG)
29th	2002	Noel Treacy (FF)	Joe Callanan (FF)	Paul Connaughton Snr (FG)	Paddy McHugh (Ind.)
30th	2007	Noel Treacy (FF)	Michael P. Kitt (FF)	Paul Connaughton Snr (FG)	Ulick Burke (FG)
31st	2011	Colm Keaveney (Lab)	Michael P. Kitt (FF)	Ciarán Cannon (FG)	Paul Connaughton Jnr (FG)
32nd	2016	Seán Canney (Ind.)	Anne Rabbitte (FF)	Ciarán Cannon (FG)	3 seats 2016–2024
33rd	2020	Seán Canney (Ind.)	Anne Rabbitte (FF)	Ciarán Cannon (FG)	3 seats 2016–2024
34th	2024	Seán Canney (Ind.)	Albert Dolan (FF)	Peter Roche (FG)	Louis O'Hara (SF)

Dáil	Election	Deputy (Party)	Deputy (Party)	Deputy (Party)
13th	1948	Frank Fahy (Note: As Ceann Comhairle, Frank Fahy was returned automatically in each of the two elections held in Galway South in 1948 and 1951. He rejoined the Fianna Fáil parliamentary party in 1951.) (FF)	Patrick Beegan (FF)	Robert Lahiffe (FF)
14th	1951	Frank Fahy (FF)	Patrick Beegan (FF)	Patrick Cawley (FG)
14th	1953 by-election	Robert Lahiffe (FF)	Patrick Beegan (FF)	Patrick Cawley (FG)
15th	1954	Robert Lahiffe (FF)	Patrick Beegan (FF)	Brendan Glynn (FG)
16th	1957	Michael Carty (FF)	Patrick Beegan (FF)	Brigid Hogan-O'Higgins (FG)
16th	1958 by-election	Michael Carty (FF)	Anthony Millar (FF)	Brigid Hogan-O'Higgins (FG)
17th	1961	Constituency abolished. See Galway East and Galway West		
