= Stephen Barrett (Irish politician) =

Irish politician, barrister and judge (1913–1976)

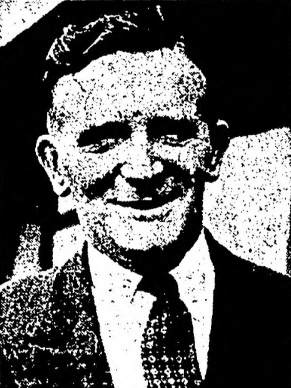
- Barrett in 1954

Teachta Dála
- In office March 1954 – June 1969
- Constituency: Cork Borough

Personal details
- Born: 26 December 1913 Cork, Ireland
- Died: 8 September 1976 (aged 62) Cork, Ireland
- Party: Fine Gael
- Spouse: Elizabeth Magnier (m. 1939)
- Children: 2
- Relatives: Edward M. Walsh (son-in-law)
- Education: University College Cork; King's Inns

Stephen Declan Barrett (26 December 1913 – 8 September 1976) was an Irish Fine Gael politician, barrister and judge.

== Early life ==
He was born 26 December 1913 in Cork, second of three children of George Barrett, leader-writer for the Cork Examiner and later editor of the Evening Echo, and Alice Mary Barrett (née O'Sullivan). His grandfather was Joseph Barrett, Lord Mayor of Cork from 1905 to 1906.

He was educated at the Christian Brothers School, Cork, University College Cork, and the King's Inns. He was called to the bar in 1946.

== Career ==
Between September 1931 and 1947 he served on the staff of the Cork Examiner as reporter, sub-editor, and, finally, chief sub-editor and assistant leader-writer. He was also correspondent for the Daily Mail and the Daily Express (1940–1947). In 1947, he left journalism to practise as a barrister on the Munster circuit, and entered politics as a local Fine Gael councillor on Cork Corporation (1950–1973), serving as Lord Mayor in 1961.

After two unsuccessful candidatures in 1948 and 1951, he was elected to Dáil Éireann as a Fine Gael Teachta Dála (TD) for the Cork Borough constituency at the 1954 by-election caused by the death of Thomas F. O'Higgins of Fine Gael. He was re-elected at each subsequent general election until he retired from politics at the 1969 general election.

Between 1969 and 1972 he served on the RTÉ authority. Appointed a temporary circuit court judge (November 1973), he was appointed in a permanent capacity for Sligo (February 1974) and was later appointed to Galway. A member of An Taisce and a founder of the Newsboys Club, Cork.

His publications included Peering at things (a weekly humorous series in the Cork Examiner (c. 1964–1967), many short stories, articles, The almost people (1973), and a one-act play, Credits due.

== Personal life ==
He married Elizabeth Magnier in 1939, and they had two daughters; Stephanie married Edward M. Walsh, founding president of the University of Limerick. The family lived at Lucerne, Douglas Road, Cork. He died on 8 September 1976 in the North Infirmary, Cork.

Civic offices
Preceded by Jane Dowdall	Lord Mayor of Cork; 1960–1961	Succeeded by Anthony Barry

Dáil	Election	Deputy (Party)	Deputy (Party)	Deputy (Party)	Deputy (Party)	Deputy (Party)
2nd	1921	Liam de Róiste (SF)	Mary MacSwiney (SF)	Donal O'Callaghan (SF)	J. J. Walsh (SF)	4 seats 1921–1923
3rd	1922	Liam de Róiste (PT-SF)	Mary MacSwiney (AT-SF)	Robert Day (Lab)	J. J. Walsh (PT-SF)	4 seats 1921–1923
4th	1923	Richard Beamish (Ind.)	Mary MacSwiney (Rep)	Andrew O'Shaughnessy (Ind.)	J. J. Walsh (CnaG)	Alfred O'Rahilly (CnaG)
4th	1924 by-election	Richard Beamish (Ind.)	Mary MacSwiney (Rep)	Andrew O'Shaughnessy (Ind.)	J. J. Walsh (CnaG)	Michael Egan (CnaG)
5th	1927 (Jun)	John Horgan (NL)	Seán French (FF)	Richard Anthony (Lab)	J. J. Walsh (CnaG)	Barry Egan (CnaG)
6th	1927 (Sep)	W. T. Cosgrave (CnaG)	Seán French (FF)	Richard Anthony (Lab)	Hugo Flinn (FF)	Barry Egan (CnaG)
7th	1932	W. T. Cosgrave (CnaG)	Thomas Dowdall (FF)	Richard Anthony (Ind.)	Hugo Flinn (FF)	William Desmond (CnaG)
8th	1933	W. T. Cosgrave (CnaG)	Thomas Dowdall (FF)	Richard Anthony (Ind.)	Hugo Flinn (FF)	William Desmond (CnaG)
9th	1937	W. T. Cosgrave (FG)	Thomas Dowdall (FF)	Richard Anthony (Ind.)	Hugo Flinn (FF)	4 seats 1937–1948
10th	1938	W. T. Cosgrave (FG)	Thomas Dowdall (FF)	James Hickey (Lab)	Hugo Flinn (FF)	4 seats 1937–1948
11th	1943	W. T. Cosgrave (FG)	Frank Daly (FF)	Richard Anthony (Ind.)	Séamus Fitzgerald (FF)	4 seats 1937–1948
12th	1944	William Dwyer (Ind.)	Frank Daly (FF)	Richard Anthony (Ind.)	Walter Furlong (FF)	4 seats 1937–1948
12th	1946 by-election	Patrick McGrath (FF)	Frank Daly (FF)	Richard Anthony (Ind.)	Walter Furlong (FF)	4 seats 1937–1948
13th	1948	Patrick McGrath (FF)	Michael Sheehan (Ind.)	James Hickey (NLP)	Jack Lynch (FF)	Thomas F. O'Higgins (FG)
14th	1951	Patrick McGrath (FF)	Seán McCarthy (FF)	James Hickey (Lab)	Jack Lynch (FF)	Thomas F. O'Higgins (FG)
14th	1954 by-election	Patrick McGrath (FF)	Seán McCarthy (FF)	James Hickey (Lab)	Jack Lynch (FF)	Stephen Barrett (FG)
15th	1954	Patrick McGrath (FF)	Anthony Barry (FG)	Seán Casey (Lab)	Jack Lynch (FF)	Stephen Barrett (FG)
15th	1956 by-election	John Galvin (FF)	Anthony Barry (FG)	Seán Casey (Lab)	Jack Lynch (FF)	Stephen Barrett (FG)
16th	1957	John Galvin (FF)	Gus Healy (FF)	Seán Casey (Lab)	Jack Lynch (FF)	Stephen Barrett (FG)
17th	1961	John Galvin (FF)	Anthony Barry (FG)	Seán Casey (Lab)	Jack Lynch (FF)	Stephen Barrett (FG)
17th	1964 by-election	Sheila Galvin (FF)	Anthony Barry (FG)	Seán Casey (Lab)	Jack Lynch (FF)	Stephen Barrett (FG)
18th	1965	Gus Healy (FF)	Pearse Wyse (FF)	Seán Casey (Lab)	Jack Lynch (FF)	Stephen Barrett (FG)
18th	1967 by-election	Gus Healy (FF)	Pearse Wyse (FF)	Seán French (FF)	Jack Lynch (FF)	Stephen Barrett (FG)
19th	1969	Constituency abolished. See Cork City North-West and Cork City South-East				
