= Patrick Cawley =

Irish politician (1904–1968)

Teachta Dála
- In office May 1951 – May 1954
- Constituency: Galway South

Personal details
- Born: 26 December 1904 County Galway, Ireland
- Died: 18 December 1968 (aged 63) County Galway, Ireland
- Party: Fine Gael

Patrick Cawley (26 December 1904 – 18 December 1968) was an Irish Fine Gael politician. He was elected on his sixth attempt, to Dáil Éireann as a Teachta Dála (TD) for the Galway South constituency at the 1951 general election. He lost his seat at the 1954 general election.

Dáil	Election	Deputy (Party)	Deputy (Party)	Deputy (Party)
13th	1948	Frank Fahy (Note: As Ceann Comhairle, Frank Fahy was returned automatically in each of the two elections held in Galway South in 1948 and 1951. He rejoined the Fianna Fáil parliamentary party in 1951.) (FF)	Patrick Beegan (FF)	Robert Lahiffe (FF)
14th	1951	Frank Fahy (FF)	Patrick Beegan (FF)	Patrick Cawley (FG)
14th	1953 by-election	Robert Lahiffe (FF)	Patrick Beegan (FF)	Patrick Cawley (FG)
15th	1954	Robert Lahiffe (FF)	Patrick Beegan (FF)	Brendan Glynn (FG)
16th	1957	Michael Carty (FF)	Patrick Beegan (FF)	Brigid Hogan-O'Higgins (FG)
16th	1958 by-election	Michael Carty (FF)	Anthony Millar (FF)	Brigid Hogan-O'Higgins (FG)
17th	1961	Constituency abolished. See Galway East and Galway West		
