= 1954 Irish general election =

Election to the 15th Dáil

- 18 May 1954

147 seats in Dáil Éireann (Note: Including Patrick Hogan (Lab), returned automatically for Clare as outgoing Ceann Comhairle, under Art. 16.6 of the Constitution and the Electoral (Chairman of Dáil Éireann) Act 1937.) 74 seats needed for a majority
- Turnout: 76.5% ▲1.2 pp
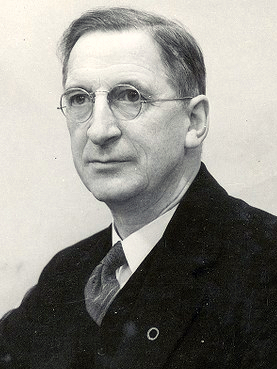

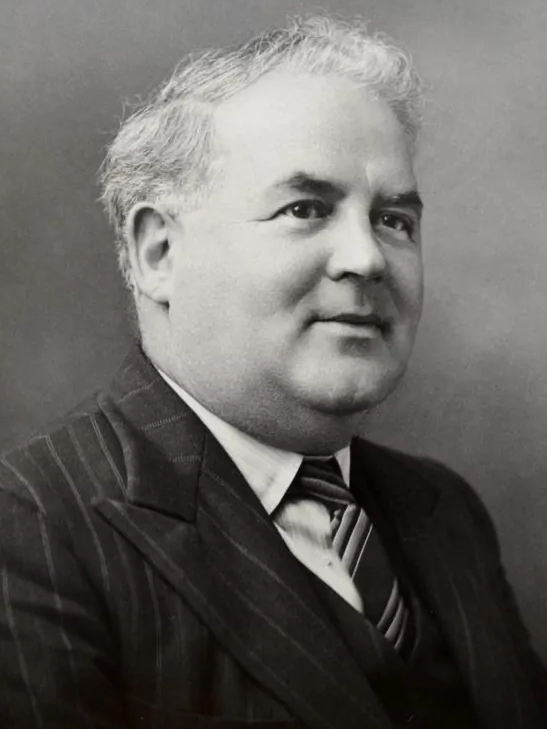

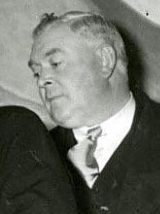

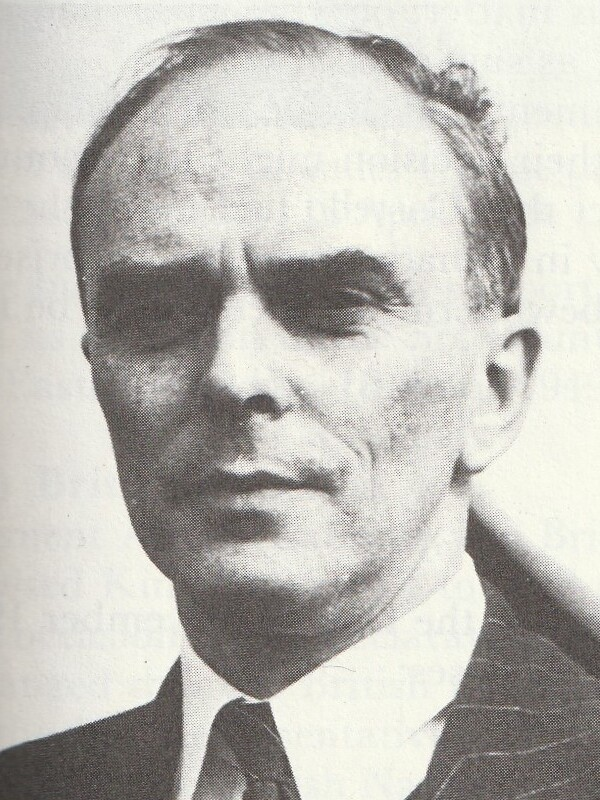
	First party	Second party	Third party
Leader	Éamon de Valera	Richard Mulcahy	William Norton
Party	Fianna Fáil	Fine Gael	Labour
Leader since	26 March 1926	1944	1932
Leader's seat	Clare	Tipperary South	Kildare
Last election	69 seats, 46.3%	40 seats, 25.8%	16 seats, 11.4%
Seats won	65	50	19
Seat change	▼4	▲8	▲3
Popular vote	578,960	427,031	161,034
Percentage	43.4%	32.0%	12.1%
Swing	▼2.9 pp	▲6.2 pp	▲0.7 pp
	Fourth party	Fifth party
Leader	Joseph Blowick	Seán MacBride
Party	Clann na Talmhan	Clann na Poblachta
Leader since	1944	1946
Leader's seat	Mayo South	Dublin South-West
Last election	6 seats, 2.9%	2 seats, 4.1%
Seats won	5	3
Seat change	▼1	▲1
Popular vote	51,069	41,249
Percentage	3.8%	3.1%
Swing	▲0.9 pp	▼1.0 pp
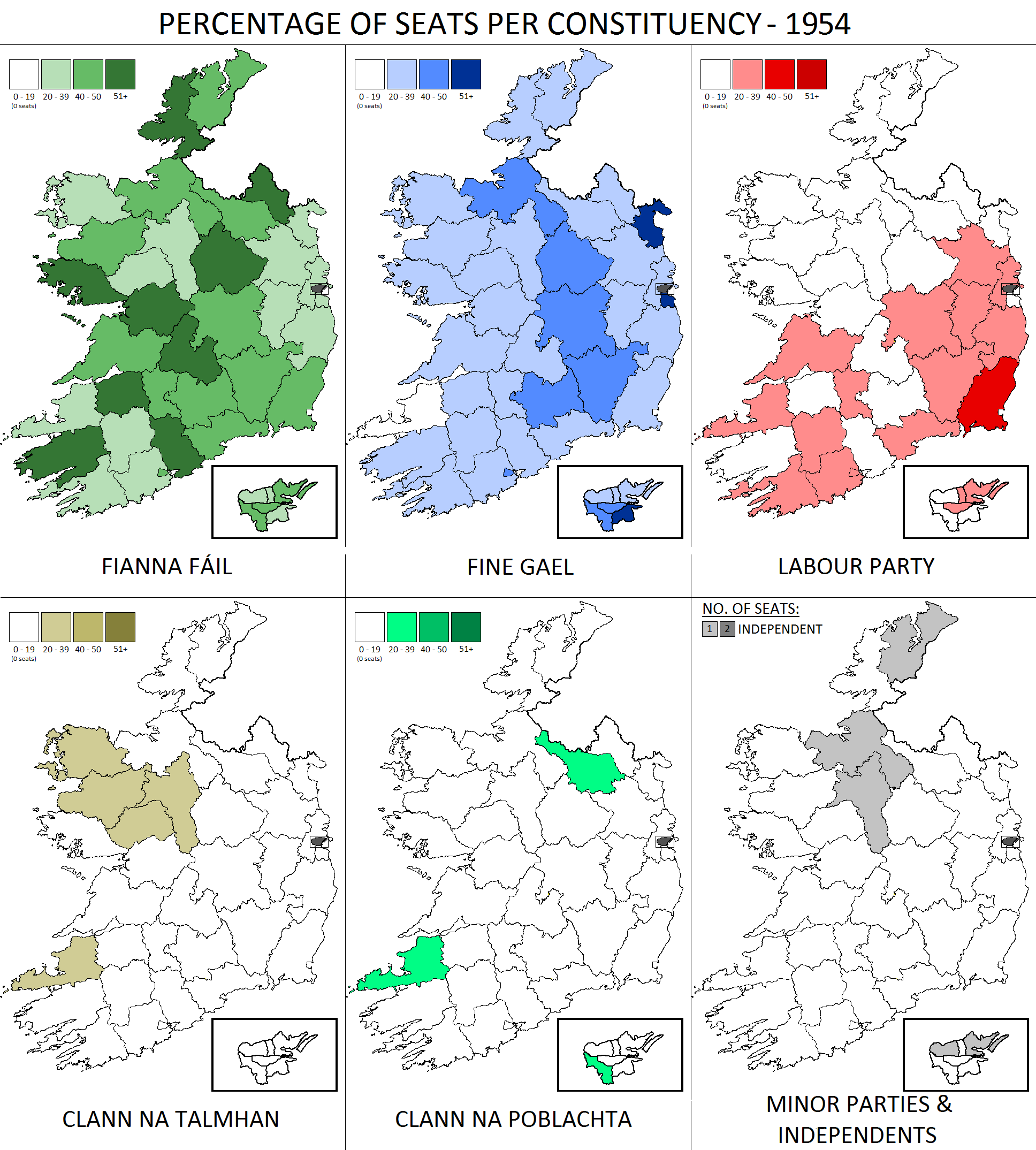
Taoiseach before election
Éamon de Valera
Fianna Fáil
Taoiseach after election
John A. Costello
Fine Gael

The 1954 Irish general election to elect the 15th Dáil was held on Tuesday, 18 May, following the dissolution of the 14th Dáil on 24 April by President Seán T. O'Kelly on the request of Taoiseach Éamon de Valera. The general election took place in 40 Dáil constituencies throughout Ireland for 147 seats in Dáil Éireann, the house of representatives of the Oireachtas.

The 15th Dáil met at Leinster House on 2 June to nominate the Taoiseach for appointment by the president and to approve the appointment of a new government of Ireland. De Valera failed to secure a majority, and John A. Costello was appointed Taoiseach, forming the second inter-party government, a minority coalition of Fine Gael, the Labour Party and Clann na Talmhan.

== Campaign ==
After the 1951 general election, Fianna Fáil had formed a minority single-party government. Shortly after the Minister for Finance, Seán MacEntee, had delivered the 1954 budget, Éamon de Valera called a general election.

Fianna Fáil had the most to lose, their campaign concentrated on providing political stability for the next five years. They also put forward strong arguments against coalition governments. However, this would not suffice when the country's economy was worsening and unemployment and emigration were increasing.

The opposition parties of Fine Gael, the Labour Party and the other minor parties offered the electorate an alternative to three years of Fianna Fáil rule.

== Result ==
Election to the 15th Dáil – 18 May 1954
Party	Leader	Seats	±	% of seats	First pref. votes	% FPv	±%
Fianna Fáil	Éamon de Valera	65	–4	44.2	578,960	43.4	–2.9
Fine Gael	Richard Mulcahy	50	+10	34.0	427,031	32.0	+6.2
Labour	William Norton	19	+2	12.9	161,034	12.1	+0.7
Clann na Talmhan	Joseph Blowick	5	–1	3.4	51,069	3.8	+0.9
Clann na Poblachta	Seán MacBride	3	+1	2.0	41,249	3.1	–1.0
Sinn Féin	Paddy McLogan	0	New	0	1,990	0.1	–
National Action		0	New	0	1,430	0.1	–
Young Ireland		0	New	0	1,037	0.1	–
Irish Workers' League	Michael O'Riordan	0	0	0	375	0.0	0.0
Independent	N/A	5	–9	3.4	70,937	5.3	–4.3
Spoilt votes					12,730	—N/a	—N/a
Total		147	0	100	1,347,842	100	—N/a
Electorate/Turnout					1,763,209	76.5%	—N/a

=== Voting summary ===
First preference vote
Fianna Fáil	43.36%
Fine Gael	31.98%
Labour	12.06%
Clann na Talmhan	3.82%
Clann na Poblachta	3.09%
Others	0.36%
Independent	5.31%

=== Seats summary ===
Dáil seats
Fianna Fáil	44.22%
Fine Gael	34.01%
Labour	12.93%
Clann na Talmhan	3.40%
Clann na Poblachta	2.04%
Independent	3.40%

== Government formation ==
Fine Gael, the Labour Party and Clann na Talmhan formed the second inter-party government, a minority government, dependent on the support of Clann na Poblachta.

== Changes in membership ==
=== First time TDs ===
- Paudge Brennan
- James Burke
- Johnny Connor
- Fintan Coogan Snr
- Edward Cotter
- Paddy Donegan
- Nicholas Egan
- Johnny Geoghegan
- Brendan Glynn
- Richard Gogan
- Edward Kelly
- Henry Kenny
- Denis Larkin
- Patrick Lindsay
- Celia Lynch
- John Moher
- Maureen O'Carroll
- John O'Donovan
- Donogh O'Malley
- James Tully

=== Retiring TDs ===
- Patrick Boland
- Peadar Duignan
- Patrick Little
- Patrick Maguire

=== Defeated TDs ===
- Patrick Browne
- Patrick Cawley
- Michael ffrench-O'Carroll
- Patrick O'Gorman
- Matthew O'Reilly
- James Reidy
- Laurence Walsh

== Seanad election ==
The Dáil election was followed by an election to the 8th Seanad.
