= 15th Dáil =

TDs from 1954 to 1957

←	14th Dáil	16th Dáil	→

Overview
- Legislative body: Dáil Éireann
- Jurisdiction: Ireland
- Meeting place: Leinster House
- Term: 2 June 1954 – 12 February 1957
- Election: 1954 general election
- Government: 7th government of Ireland
- Members: 147
- Ceann Comhairle: Patrick Hogan
- Taoiseach: John A. Costello
- Tánaiste: William Norton
- Chief Whip: Denis J. O'Sullivan
- Leader of the Opposition: Éamon de Valera

Sessions
- 1st: 2 June 1954 – 15 July 1954
- 2nd: 27 October 1954 – 14 July 1955
- 3rd: 26 October 1955 – 26 July 1956
- 4th: 24 October 1956 – 13 December 1956

The 15th Dáil was elected at the 1954 general election on 14 May 1954 and met on 2 June 1954. The members of Dáil Éireann, the house of representatives of the Oireachtas (legislature), of Ireland are known as TDs. It sat with the 8th Seanad as the two Houses of the Oireachtas.

On 12 February 1957, President Seán T. O'Kelly dissolved the Dáil at the request of the Taoiseach John A. Costello on 4 February. The 15th Dáil lasted 2 years, 255 days.

== Composition of the 15th Dáil ==
- Second Inter-Party Government (7th government) coalition parties
- Providing confidence and supply

Party	May 1954	Feb. 1957	Change
Fianna Fáil	65	68	▲3
Fine Gael	50	48	▼2
Labour	19	17	▼2
Clann na Talmhan	5	5	Steady
Clann na Poblachta	3	3	Steady
Independent	5	5	Steady
Ceann Comhairle	—N/a	1	▲1
Total	147		

Fine Gael, the Labour Party, and Clann na Talmhan formed the 7th government of Ireland, a minority government dependent on the support of Clann na Poblachta.

=== Graphical representation ===
This is a graphical comparison of party strengths in the 15th Dáil from June 1954. This was not the official seating plan.

== Ceann Comhairle ==
On the meeting of the Dáil, Patrick Hogan (Lab), who had served as Ceann Comhairle in the previous Dáil, was proposed by Éamon de Valera (FF) and seconded by Richard Mulcahy (FG) for the position. His election was approved without a vote. Hogan had served as Leas-Cheann Comhairle from 1927 to 1928, from 1932 to 1938 and from 1948 to 1951.

== TDs by constituency ==
The list of the 147 TDs elected is given in alphabetical order by Dáil constituency.

Members of the 15th Dáil
Constituency	Name	Party
Carlow–Kilkenny	Patrick Crotty	Fine Gael
Carlow–Kilkenny	Joseph Hughes	Fine Gael
Carlow–Kilkenny	Thomas Derrig	Fianna Fáil
Carlow–Kilkenny	James Pattison	Labour
Carlow–Kilkenny	Thomas Walsh	Fianna Fáil
Cavan	Patrick O'Reilly	Fine Gael
Cavan	Michael Sheridan	Fianna Fáil
Cavan	Paddy Smith	Fianna Fáil
Cavan	John Tully	Clann na Poblachta
Clare	Éamon de Valera	Fianna Fáil
Clare	Patrick Hillery	Fianna Fáil
Clare	Patrick Hogan	Labour
Clare	William Murphy	Fine Gael
Cork Borough	Stephen Barrett	Fine Gael
Cork Borough	Anthony Barry	Fine Gael
Cork Borough	Seán Casey	Labour
Cork Borough	Jack Lynch	Fianna Fáil
Cork Borough	Patrick McGrath	Fianna Fáil
Cork East	Richard Barry	Fine Gael
Cork East	Martin Corry	Fianna Fáil
Cork East	John Moher	Fianna Fáil
Cork North	Patrick McAuliffe	Labour
Cork North	Seán Moylan	Fianna Fáil
Cork North	Denis O'Sullivan	Fine Gael
Cork South	Dan Desmond	Labour
Cork South	Seán McCarthy	Fianna Fáil
Cork South	Tadhg Manley	Fine Gael
Cork West	Seán Collins	Fine Gael
Cork West	Edward Cotter	Fianna Fáil
Cork West	Michael Pat Murphy	Labour
Donegal East	Neil Blaney	Fianna Fáil
Donegal East	Liam Cunningham	Fianna Fáil
Donegal East	Daniel McMenamin	Fine Gael
Donegal East	William Sheldon	Independent
Donegal West	Joseph Brennan	Fianna Fáil
Donegal West	Cormac Breslin	Fianna Fáil
Donegal West	Patrick O'Donnell	Fine Gael
Dublin County	Patrick Burke	Fianna Fáil
Dublin County	Seán Dunne	Labour
Dublin County	Éamon Rooney	Fine Gael
Dublin North-Central	Vivion de Valera	Fianna Fáil
Dublin North-Central	Patrick McGilligan	Fine Gael
Dublin North-Central	Maureen O'Carroll	Labour
Dublin North-East	Jack Belton	Fine Gael
Dublin North-East	Alfie Byrne	Independent
Dublin North-East	Harry Colley	Fianna Fáil
Dublin North-East	Denis Larkin	Labour
Dublin North-East	Oscar Traynor	Fianna Fáil
Dublin North-West	Thomas Byrne	Independent
Dublin North-West	Declan Costello	Fine Gael
Dublin North-West	Richard Gogan	Fianna Fáil
Dublin South-Central	Maurice E. Dockrell	Fine Gael
Dublin South-Central	Thomas Finlay	Fine Gael
Dublin South-Central	James Larkin Jnr	Labour
Dublin South-Central	Seán Lemass	Fianna Fáil
Dublin South-Central	Celia Lynch	Fianna Fáil
Dublin South-East	John A. Costello	Fine Gael
Dublin South-East	Seán MacEntee	Fianna Fáil
Dublin South-East	John O'Donovan	Fine Gael
Dublin South-West	Robert Briscoe	Fianna Fáil
Dublin South-West	Bernard Butler	Fianna Fáil
Dublin South-West	Peadar Doyle	Fine Gael
Dublin South-West	Seán MacBride	Clann na Poblachta
Dublin South-West	Michael O'Higgins	Fine Gael
Dún Laoghaire and Rathdown	Seán Brady	Fianna Fáil
Dún Laoghaire and Rathdown	Liam Cosgrave	Fine Gael
Dún Laoghaire and Rathdown	H. Percy Dockrell	Fine Gael
Galway North	Michael Donnellan	Clann na Talmhan
Galway North	James Hession	Fine Gael
Galway North	Mark Killilea Snr	Fianna Fáil
Galway South	Patrick Beegan	Fianna Fáil
Galway South	Brendan Glynn	Fine Gael
Galway South	Robert Lahiffe	Fianna Fáil
Galway West	Gerald Bartley	Fianna Fáil
Galway West	Fintan Coogan	Fine Gael
Galway West	Johnny Geoghegan	Fianna Fáil
Kerry North	Johnny Connor	Clann na Poblachta
Kerry North	Patrick Finucane	Clann na Talmhan
Kerry North	Tom McEllistrim	Fianna Fáil
Kerry North	Dan Spring	Labour
Kerry South	Honor Crowley	Fianna Fáil
Kerry South	John Flynn	Fianna Fáil
Kerry South	Patrick Palmer	Fine Gael
Kildare	Thomas Harris	Fianna Fáil
Kildare	William Norton	Labour
Kildare	Gerard Sweetman	Fine Gael
Leix–Offaly	William Davin	Labour
Leix–Offaly	Nicholas Egan	Fianna Fáil
Leix–Offaly	Oliver J. Flanagan	Fine Gael
Leix–Offaly	Peadar Maher	Fianna Fáil
Leix–Offaly	Tom O'Higgins	Fine Gael
Limerick East	John Carew	Fine Gael
Limerick East	Tadhg Crowley	Fianna Fáil
Limerick East	Michael Keyes	Labour
Limerick East	Donogh O'Malley	Fianna Fáil
Limerick West	James Collins	Fianna Fáil
Limerick West	David Madden	Fine Gael
Limerick West	Donnchadh Ó Briain	Fianna Fáil
Longford–Westmeath	Frank Carter	Fianna Fáil
Longford–Westmeath	Erskine H. Childers	Fianna Fáil
Longford–Westmeath	Charles Fagan	Fine Gael
Longford–Westmeath	Michael Kennedy	Fianna Fáil
Longford–Westmeath	Seán Mac Eoin	Fine Gael
Louth	Frank Aiken	Fianna Fáil
Louth	George Coburn	Fine Gael
Louth	Paddy Donegan	Fine Gael
Mayo North	Phelim Calleary	Fianna Fáil
Mayo North	Patrick Lindsay	Fine Gael
Mayo North	Thomas O'Hara	Clann na Talmhan
Mayo South	Joseph Blowick	Clann na Talmhan
Mayo South	Seán Flanagan	Fianna Fáil
Mayo South	Henry Kenny	Fine Gael
Mayo South	Mícheál Ó Móráin	Fianna Fáil
Meath	Patrick Giles	Fine Gael
Meath	Michael Hilliard	Fianna Fáil
Meath	James Tully	Labour
Monaghan	James Dillon	Fine Gael
Monaghan	Edward Kelly	Fianna Fáil
Monaghan	Patrick Mooney	Fianna Fáil
Roscommon	John Beirne	Clann na Talmhan
Roscommon	Gerald Boland	Fianna Fáil
Roscommon	James Burke	Fine Gael
Roscommon	Jack McQuillan	Independent
Sligo–Leitrim	Stephen Flynn	Fianna Fáil
Sligo–Leitrim	Eugene Gilbride	Fianna Fáil
Sligo–Leitrim	Bernard Maguire	Independent
Sligo–Leitrim	Mary Reynolds	Fine Gael
Sligo–Leitrim	Joseph Roddy	Fine Gael
Tipperary North	John Fanning	Fianna Fáil
Tipperary North	Daniel Morrissey	Fine Gael
Tipperary North	Mary Ryan	Fianna Fáil
Tipperary South	Dan Breen	Fianna Fáil
Tipperary South	Patrick Crowe	Fine Gael
Tipperary South	Michael Davern	Fianna Fáil
Tipperary South	Richard Mulcahy	Fine Gael
Waterford	William Kenneally	Fianna Fáil
Waterford	Thomas Kyne	Labour
Waterford	Thaddeus Lynch	Fine Gael
Waterford	John Ormonde	Fianna Fáil
Wexford	Denis Allen	Fianna Fáil
Wexford	Brendan Corish	Labour
Wexford	Anthony Esmonde	Fine Gael
Wexford	John O'Leary	Labour
Wexford	James Ryan	Fianna Fáil
Wicklow	Paudge Brennan	Fianna Fáil
Wicklow	Mark Deering	Fine Gael
Wicklow	James Everett	Labour

== Changes ==
Date	Constituency	Loss	Gain	Note
2 June 1954	Clare	Labour	Ceann Comhairle	Patrick Hogan takes office as Ceann Comhairle
31 July 1955	Limerick West	Fine Gael		Death of David Madden
11 December 1955	Kerry North	Clann na Poblachta		Death of Johnny Connor
13 December 1955	Limerick West		Fianna Fáil	Michael Colbert wins the seat vacated by the death of Madden
29 February 1956	Kerry North		Clann na Poblachta	Kathleen O'Connor holds the seat vacated by the death of her father Johnny Connor
1 March 1956	Leix–Offaly	Labour		Death of William Davin
13 March 1956	Dublin North-East	Independent		Death of Alfie Byrne
30 April 1956	Leix–Offaly		Fianna Fáil	Kieran Egan wins the seat vacated by the death of Davin
30 April 1956	Dublin North-East		Independent	Patrick Byrne holds the seat vacated by the death of his father Alfie Byrne
20 June 1956	Cork Borough	Fianna Fáil		Death of Patrick McGrath
2 August 1956	Cork Borough		Fianna Fáil	John Galvin holds the seat vacated by the death of McGrath
14 July 1956	Carlow–Kilkenny	Fianna Fáil		Death of Thomas Walsh
4 August 1956	Dublin South-West	Fine Gael		Death of Peadar Doyle
14 November 1956	Carlow–Kilkenny		Fianna Fáil	Martin Medlar holds the seat vacated by the death of Walsh
14 November 1956	Dublin South-West		Fianna Fáil	Noel Lemass wins the seat vacated by the death of Doyle
