= Kieran Egan =

Kieran Egan may refer to:

- Kieran Egan (politician) (1916–1976), Irish Fianna Fáil politician
- Kieran Egan (philosopher) (1942–2022), English educational philosopher
