= 1956 Carlow–Kilkenny by-election =

By-election to the 15th Dáil

- 14 November 1956
- Turnout: 41,151 (70.7%)
	Medlar	Fielding	Devoy
Nominee	Martin Medlar	Thomas Fielding	Herbert Devoy
Party	Fianna Fáil	Fine Gael	Labour
First preferences	23,782	11,752	5,617
Percentage	57.8%	28.6%	13.7%
Final count	–	13,137	7,438
TD before election
Thomas Walsh
Fianna Fáil
TD after election
Martin Medlar
Fianna Fáil

A Dáil by-election was held in the constituency of Carlow–Kilkenny in Ireland on Wednesday, 14 November 1956, to fill a vacancy in the 15th Dáil. It followed the death of Fianna Fáil Teachta Dála (TD) Thomas Walsh on 14 July 1956.

The writ of election to fill the vacancy was agreed by the Dáil on 25 October 1956.

The by-election was won by the Fianna Fáil candidate Martin Medlar.

The surplus votes of the elected candidate Medlar, were distributed after he was declared elected. This was because there was a possibility another candidate could have reached the threshold of a third of a quota which would have meant their election deposit was returned to them.

It was held on the same day as the 1956 Dublin South-West by-election. Both by-elections were won by Fianna Fáil candidates.

== Result ==
1956 Carlow–Kilkenny by-election
Party	Candidate	FPv%	Count	
Party	Candidate	FPv%	1	2
Fianna Fáil	Martin Medlar	57.8	23,782	
Fine Gael	Thomas Fielding	28.6	11,752	13,137
Labour	Herbert Devoy	13.7	5,617	7,438
Electorate: 58,216 Valid: 41,151 Quota: 20,576 Turnout: 70.7%
