= 1956 Leix–Offaly by-election =

By-election to the 15th Dáil

- 30 April 1956
- Turnout: 42,428 (71.8%)
	Egan	Davin
Nominee	Kieran Egan	Michael Davin
Party	Fianna Fáil	Labour
First preferences	23,565	18,863
Percentage	55.5%	44.5%
TD before election
William Davin
Labour
TD after election
Kieran Egan
Fianna Fáil

A Dáil by-election was held in the constituency of Leix–Offaly in Ireland on Monday, 30 April 1956, to fill a vacancy in the 15th Dáil. It followed the death of Labour Teachta Dála (TD) William Davin on 1 March 1956.

The writ of election to fill the vacancy was agreed by the Dáil on 10 April 1956.

The by-election was won by the Fianna Fáil candidate Kieran Egan.

It was held on the same day as the 1956 Dublin North-East by-election.

== Result ==
1956 Leix–Offaly by-election
Party	Candidate	FPv%	Count
Party	Candidate	FPv%	1
Fianna Fáil	Kieran Egan	55.5	23,565
Labour	Michael Davin	44.5	18,863
Electorate: 59,075 Valid: 42,428 Quota: 21,215 Turnout: 71.8%
