= 1952 Dublin North-West by-election =

By-election to the 14th Dáil

- 12 November 1952
- Turnout: 21,400 (62.1%)
| | Byrne | Clarkin | O'Rahilly |
| Nominee | Thomas Byrne | Andrew Clarkin | MacEllistrum O'Rahilly |
| Party | Independent | Fianna Fáil | Clann na Poblachta |
| First preferences | 13,078 | 6,629 | 1,693 |
| Percentage | 61.1% | 31.0% | 7.9% |
| Final count | – | 7,075 | 3,624 |
TD before election
A. P. Byrne
Independent
TD after election
Thomas Byrne
Independent

A Dáil by-election was held in the constituency of Dublin North-West in Ireland on Wednesday, 12 November 1952, to fill a vacancy in the 14th Dáil. It followed the death of independent Teachta Dála (TD) A. P. Byrne on 26 July 1952.

The writ of election to fill the vacancy was agreed by the Dáil on 23 October 1952.

The by-election was won by the independent candidate Thomas Byrne, brother of the deceased TD, A. P. Byrne. He was introduced to the Dáil by his father Alfie Byrne, who was a TD for Dublin North-East.

The surplus votes of the elected candidate Thomas Byrne, were distributed after being declared elected. This was because there was a possibility another candidate could have reached the threshold of a third of a quota which would have meant their election deposit was returned to them.

== Result ==
1952 Dublin North-West by-election
| Party | Candidate | FPv% | Count | |
| Party | Candidate | FPv% | 1 | 2 |
|---|---|---|---|---|
| Independent | Thomas Byrne | 61.1 | 13,078 | |
| Fianna Fáil | Andrew Clarkin | 31.0 | 6,629 | 7,075 |
| Clann na Poblachta | MacEllistrum O'Rahilly | 7.9 | 1,693 | 3,624 |
Electorate: 34,481 Valid: 21,400 Quota: 10,701 Turnout: 62.1%
