= 1964 Cork Borough by-election =

By-election to the 17th Dáil

- 19 February 1964
- Turnout: 38,047 (69.1%)
	Galvin	Manley	Hurley
Nominee	Sheila Galvin	Tadhg Manley	Donal Hurley
Party	Fianna Fáil	Fine Gael	Labour
First preferences	20,276	11,475	6,296
Percentage	53.3%	30.2%	16.6%
Final count	–	11,666	7,357
TD before election
John Galvin
Fianna Fáil
TD after election
Sheila Galvin
Fianna Fáil

A Dáil by-election was held in the constituency of Cork Borough in Ireland on Wednesday, 19 February 1964, to fill a vacancy in the 17th Dáil. It followed the death of Fianna Fáil Teachta Dála (TD) John Galvin on 11 October 1963.

On 13 November 1963, Seán Casey, Labour Party TD for Cork Borough, proposed a motion that the writ of election be issued. This was opposed by the Fianna Fáil government and was defeated by 67 to 71. A government motion to issue the writ was agreed by the Dáil on 29 January 1964.

The by-election was won by the Fianna Fáil candidate Sheila Galvin, widow of the deceased TD, John Galvin. It was held on the same day as the 1964 Kildare by-election. Both by-elections were won by Fianna Fáil candidates.

The surplus votes of the elected candidate, Sheila Galvin, were distributed after she was declared elected because there was a possibility another candidate could have reached the threshold of a third of a quota. This would have meant their election deposit was returned to them.

Sheila Galvin did not contest the 1965 general election and retired from politics.

== Result ==
1964 Cork Borough by-election
Party	Candidate	FPv%	Count	
Party	Candidate	FPv%	1	2
Fianna Fáil	Sheila Galvin	53.3	20,276	
Fine Gael	Tadhg Manley	30.2	11,475	11,666
Labour	Donal Hurley	16.6	6,296	7,357
Electorate: 55,076 Valid: 38,047 Quota: 19,024 Turnout: 69.1%
