= William Abraham (Irish politician) =

Irish politician

William Abraham (1840 – 2 August 1915) was an Irish Member of Parliament (MP) in the United Kingdom House of Commons.

== Early life ==
William Abraham was born in Limerick city, the son of William Abraham of Mount Prospect, Roxborough, Limerick, and his wife Eliza. He was raised as a member of the Congregationalist church, leading him to joke in later life that he was of 'old Cromwellian stock' (Oliver Cromwell was also a Congregationalist). He had three sisters, of whom the eldest, Rose, married the prominent Shetland-born local businessman Peter Tait, founder of the Limerick Clothing Factory. Abraham, like his brothers-in-law, was a manager in that factory, and in around 1868 became a partner in the new firm of Peter Tait and Co. This association continued even after Tait sold the firm in 1884, and in 1890 Abraham became a director of its successor, the Auxiliary Forces Uniform and Equipment Company, lobbying successfully on its behalf in Parliament. He also remained a proprietor of his father's plant nursery at Mount Prospect throughout the 1870s and 1880s.

== Political career ==
Despite his Protestant identity, Abraham became active in Irish Nationalist politics. He was involved in the Irish Land League in 1881 and was at one stage imprisoned as a political suspect. He served as Chairman of Limerick Board of Guardians (who administered the Poor Law in their district) from 1882 to 1883 and again from 1885 to 1886.

Abraham represented three constituencies at Westminster. He was elected unopposed as MP for West Limerick at the 1885 general election as a Nationalist supporter of the Irish Parliamentary Party, and served until he retired in 1892. In December 1890, he was the proposer of the vote of no confidence in Charles Stewart Parnell as leader in Committee Room 15, and he joined the Anti-Parnellite Irish National Federation. In 1893, he was elected unopposed as an Anti-Parnellite Nationalist at a by-election for North East Cork, succeeding Michael Davitt, and sat until he was defeated in the January 1910 general election by the dissident Nationalist William O'Brien, by the wide margin of 2,984 votes to 1,510. He was unopposed at the by-election for Dublin Harbour in June 1910, and won comfortably against an O'Brienite Nationalist in the same seat in the general election of December 1910. He represented Dublin Harbour until his death in 1915.

According to the Irish Independent, he was assiduous in his duties at Westminster, and spoke at one time or another in every constituency in Great Britain, including Orkney and Shetland. His Protestant faith, gift for public speaking and relatively moderate outlook made him "a considerable asset at Gladstonian meetings in Britain." From 1886 to 1895 he regularly campaigned for Liberal candidates in British by-elections, remaining convinced that victory for the Liberal Party under Gladstone was the surest way to secure Home Rule for Ireland. In addition, Abraham was a committee member of the Irish National League of Great Britain and its successor organisation, the United Irish League of Great Britain, until his death. He was also a Treasurer of the Irish National Federation, and a prominent member of the Public Accounts Committee of the House of Commons. However, in Patrick Maume's view, his age and lack of local contacts made him ineffective in his final role as a Dublin MP.

== Personal life ==
Abraham was married to Ann Jane, and had two sons and two daughters. Latterly, he lived in Hornsey in north London, and when he died of heart failure in 1915 he was buried in the nonconformist section of East Finchley Cemetery.

=== Louis Abraham ===
Abraham's youngest son, Louis Arnold Abraham (1893–1983), was a parliamentary official of considerable standing for nearly 40 years. Educated at Owen's School in Islington, he won an exhibition to read history at Peterhouse, Cambridge, where he graduated with first-class honours in 1920. A committed Liberal like his father, he was elected President of the Cambridge University Liberal Club during Michaelmas term in 1915, a one-year period in office that was cut short by war service. On return to Cambridge in 1919 for his final year he was elected President of the Cambridge Union Society. Abraham was appointed to an Assistant Clerkship of the House of Commons by Sir Courtenay Ilbert in 1920, becoming a Senior Clerk in 1932, a Clerk of Private Bills in 1945, and, finally, the Principal Clerk of Committees from 1952 until his retirement in 1958. Known for his "extraordinary breadth of knowledge of parliamentary law and precedent", he drafted the chapter on Parliament for the edition of Erskine May’s Parliamentary Practice that appeared in 1946. An authority on the law of privilege, he submitted a memorandum to the Select Committee on Parliamentary Privilege in 1966, which was later praised by Quintin Hogg as "one of the most distinguished pieces of work I have read for some time." His books include A Parliamentary Dictionary (1956), written with S. C. Hawtrey. Abraham was made a Commander of the British Empire (CBE) in 1950 and a Companion of the Order of the Bath (CB) in 1956.

Parliament of the United Kingdom
New constituency	Member of Parliament for West Limerick; 1885 – 1892	Succeeded by Michael Austin
Preceded by Michael Davitt	Member of Parliament for North East Cork; 1893 – January 1910	Succeeded by William O'Brien
Preceded by Timothy Charles Harrington	Member of Parliament for Dublin Harbour; 1910 – 1915	Succeeded by Alfie Byrne
