= Dublin Harbour (UK Parliament constituency) =

UK parliamentary constituency in Ireland, 1885–1922

- Former borough constituency for the House of Commons
- Dublin Harbour constituency within Dublin, as it existed from 1885 to 1918.

1885–1922
- Seats: 1
- Created from: Dublin
- Replaced by: Dublin Mid

Dublin Harbour, a division of Dublin, was a borough parliamentary constituency in Ireland. It returned one Member of Parliament (MP) to the House of Commons of the United Kingdom from 1885 until 1922. From 1918 to 1921, it was also used as a constituency for Dáil Éireann.

== Boundaries ==
This constituency comprised part of the city of Dublin. It included Dublin Port and red light district of Dublin and was one of the poorest constituencies in Ireland.

From 1885 to 1918, it was defined as:

Mountjoy Ward,

North Dock Ward, Rotunda Ward (except so much as is comprised in College Green constituency), so much of South Dock Ward and Trinity Wards as lies north of a line drawn along the centre of Great Brunswick Street,

the townlands of Ringsend and Irishtown, and so much of Beggar's Bush bounded on the north and west by the municipal boundary of North Dock and South Dock wards, on the west and south-west by a line drawn along the centres of Grand Canal Street and Shelbourne Road, on the south by a line drawn along the centre of Haig's Avenue, and on the east by Irishtown.

From 1918 to 1922, it was defined as:

the North Dock Ward, those parts of South Dock and Trinity Wards which is not included in the St Stephen's Green Division, and that part of Mountjoy Ward, which lies to the east and south of a line drawn continuously along the middle of Great Britain Street, Summerhill, and Summerhill Parade to the middle of the North Wall Extension of the Midland and Great Western Railway, and thence in a south-easterly direction along the centre of the railway to the ward boundary.

== History ==
Prior to the 1885 general election, the city was the undivided two-member Dublin City constituency. Under the Redistribution of Seats Act 1885, Dublin was divided into four divisions: College Green, Dublin Harbour, St Stephen's Green and St Patrick's. Dublin Harbour was a very heavily Nationalist area. The Irish Parliamentary Party only lost political control of the constituency in 1918.

Under the Redistribution of Seats (Ireland) Act 1918, the city was allocated seven seats: in addition to the four existing constituencies, the new divisions were Clontarf, St James's and St Michan's.

Sinn Féin used the 1918 general election to elect members of Dáil Éireann, inviting all those elected in Ireland to sit as a Teachta Dála (known in English as a Deputy) in the Dáil, although only the Sinn Féin members attended. Philip Shanahan, who had participated in the Easter Rising defeated the incumbent MP, Alfie Byrne, a formidable politician who would play a prominent role in Dublin and Irish politics for almost half a century. Shanahan sat as a member of the First Dáil.

Under the Government of Ireland Act 1920, the area was combined with the College Green Division to form Dublin Mid, a 4-seat constituency for the Southern Ireland House of Commons and a single constituency at Westminster. At the 1921 election for the Southern Ireland House of Commons, the four seats were won uncontested by Sinn Féin, who treated it as part of the election to the Second Dáil. Philip Shanahan was one of the four TDs for Dublin Mid.

Under s. 1(4) of the Irish Free State (Agreement) Act 1922, no writ was to be issued "for a constituency in Ireland other than a constituency in Northern Ireland". Therefore, no vote was held in Dublin Mid at the 1922 United Kingdom general election on 15 November 1922, shortly before the Irish Free State left the United Kingdom on 6 December 1922.

== Members of Parliament ==
Year	MP	Party
1885	Timothy Harrington	Irish Parliamentary
1891	Timothy Harrington	Irish National League (Parnellite)
1897	Timothy Harrington	Ind. Nationalist
1900	Timothy Harrington	Irish Parliamentary
1910	William Abraham	Irish Parliamentary
1915	Alfie Byrne	Irish Parliamentary
1918	Philip Shanahan	Sinn Féin
1922	constituency abolished	

== Elections ==
=== Elections in the 1880s ===
1885 general election: Dublin Harbour
Party	Candidate	Votes	%	±%
Irish Parliamentary	Timothy Harrington	6,717	80.5	
Liberal	Rowland Blennerhassett	1,628	19.5	
Majority		5,089	61.0	
Turnout		8,345	74.0	
Registered electors		11,282		
Irish Parliamentary win (new seat)				

1886 general election: Dublin Harbour
Party	Candidate	Votes	%	±%
Irish Parliamentary	Timothy Harrington	Unopposed		
Irish Parliamentary hold				

=== Elections in the 1890s ===
1892 general election: Dublin Harbour
Party	Candidate	Votes	%	±%
Irish National League	Timothy Harrington	4,482	76.5	N/A
Irish National Federation	James McDonnell	1,376	23.5	N/A
Majority		3,106	53.0	N/A
Turnout		5,858	51.5	N/A
Registered electors		11,370		
Irish National League gain from Irish Parliamentary		Swing	N/A	

1895 general election: Dublin Harbour
Party	Candidate	Votes	%	±%
Irish National League	Timothy Harrington	Unopposed		
Irish National League hold				

=== Elections in the 1900s ===
1900 general election: Dublin Harbour
Party	Candidate	Votes	%	±%
Irish Parliamentary	Timothy Harrington	Unopposed		
Irish Parliamentary hold				

1906 general election: Dublin Harbour
Party	Candidate	Votes	%	±%
Irish Parliamentary	Timothy Harrington	3,638	80.7	N/A
Liberal Unionist	John Lincoln Mahon	872	19.3	New
Majority		2,766	61.4	N/A
Turnout		4,510	51.2	N/A
Registered electors		8,813		
Irish Parliamentary hold		Swing	N/A	

=== Elections in the 1910s ===
January 1910 general election: Dublin Harbour
Party	Candidate	Votes	%	±%
Irish Parliamentary	Timothy Harrington	Unopposed		
Irish Parliamentary hold				

1910 by-election: Dublin Harbour
Party	Candidate	Votes	%	±%
Irish Parliamentary	William Abraham	Unopposed		
Irish Parliamentary hold				

December 1910 general election: Dublin Harbour
Party	Candidate	Votes	%	±%
Irish Parliamentary	William Abraham	3,244	83.7	N/A
All-for-Ireland	James Brady	631	16.3	New
Majority		2,613	67.4	N/A
Turnout		3,875	42.9	N/A
Registered electors		9,038		
Irish Parliamentary hold		Swing	N/A	

1915 by-election: Dublin Harbour
Party	Candidate	Votes	%	±%
Irish Parliamentary	Alfie Byrne	2,208	58.14	−25.6
Healyite Nationalist	Pierce O'Mahony	913	24.04	N/A
Irish Nationalist	John Joseph Farrell	677	17.83	N/A
Majority		1,295	34.10	−33.3
Turnout		3,798	43.26	+0.4
Registered electors		8,780		
Irish Parliamentary hold		Swing		

1918 general election: Dublin Harbour
Party	Candidate	Votes	%	±%
Sinn Féin	Philip Shanahan	7,708	58.9	New
Irish Parliamentary	Alfie Byrne	5,386	41.1	−42.6
Majority		2,322	17.8	N/A
Turnout		13,094	67.1	+24.2
Registered electors		19,520		
Sinn Féin gain from Irish Parliamentary		Swing		

== See also ==
- Historic Dáil constituencies

== Notes, citations and sources ==
=== Sources ===
- Walker, Brian M., ed. (1978). Parliamentary Election Results in Ireland, 1801–1922. Dublin: Royal Irish Academy. ISBN 0901714127.
- Boundary Commission (Ireland) established in 1917 to redistribute seats in the House of Commons under the terms of the Representation of the People Bill, 1917 (1917). "Schedule 10 : Parliamentary borough of Dublin" ( (PDF)). Report. Vol. CSO/RP/1917/29520/36. National Archives of Ireland. Archived from the original on 4 December 2017.

=== External links ===
- Dáil Éireann Members Database Office of the Houses of the Oireachtas
- Dublin Historic Maps: Parliamentary & Dail Constituencies 1780–1969 (a work in progress)
