= 1956 Dublin South-West by-election =

By-election to the 15th Dáil

- 14 November 1956
- Turnout: 24,098 (38.1%)
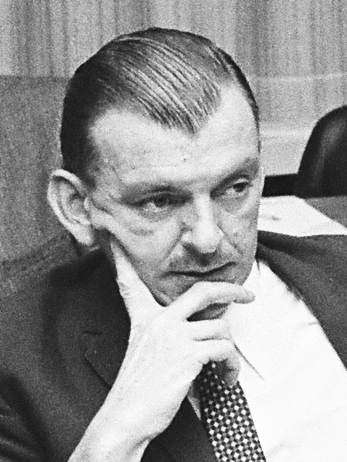
		Power
Nominee	Noel Lemass	Edmond Power
Party	Fianna Fáil	Fine Gael
First preferences	14,416	9,682
Percentage	59.8%	40.2%
TD before election
Peadar Doyle
Fine Gael
TD after election
Noel Lemass
Fianna Fáil

A Dáil by-election was held in the constituency of Dublin South-West in Ireland on Wednesday, 14 November 1956, to fill a vacancy in the 15th Dáil. It followed the death of Fine Gael Teachta Dála (TD) Peadar Doyle on 4 August 1956.

The writ of election to fill the vacancy was agreed by the Dáil on 25 October 1956.

The by-election was won by the Fianna Fáil candidate Noel Lemass.

It was held on the same day as the 1956 Carlow–Kilkenny by-election. Both by-elections were won by Fianna Fáil candidates.

== Result ==
1956 Dublin South-West by-election
Party	Candidate	FPv%	Count
Party	Candidate	FPv%	1
Fianna Fáil	Noel Lemass	59.8	14,416
Fine Gael	Edmond Power	40.2	9,682
Electorate: 63,286 Valid: 24,098 Quota: 12,050 Turnout: 38.1%
