= 1910 Dublin Harbour by-election =

UK Parliamentary by-election

The 1910 Dublin Harbour by-election was held on 14 June 1910. The by-election was held due to the death of the incumbent Irish Parliamentary MP, Timothy Harrington. It was won by the Irish Parliamentary candidate William Abraham, who was returned unopposed.
