= 1915 Dublin Harbour by-election =

UK Parliamentary by-election

The 1915 Dublin Harbour by-election was held on 1 October 1915. The by-election was held due to the death of the incumbent Irish Parliamentary Party MP, William Abraham. It was won by the Irish Parliamentary candidate Alfie Byrne.

1915 Dublin Harbour by-election Electorate 8,780
Party	Candidate	Votes	%	±%
Irish Parliamentary	Alfie Byrne	2,208	58.14	−25.6
Healyite Nationalist	Pierce O'Mahony	913	24.04	N/A
Irish Nationalist	John Joseph Farrell	677	17.83	N/A
Majority		1,295	34.10	−33.3
Turnout		3,798	43.26	+0.4
Irish Parliamentary hold		Swing		
