= A. P. Byrne =

Irish politician (1913–1952)

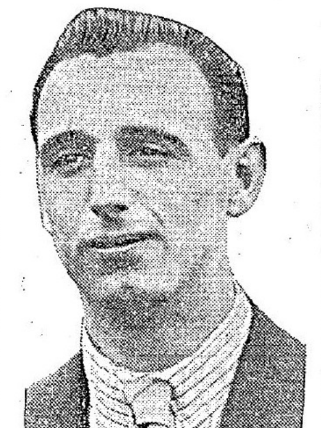
- Byrne in 1948

Teachta Dála
- In office February 1948 – 26 July 1952
- In office July 1937 – May 1944
- Constituency: Dublin North-West

Personal details
- Born: Alfred Patrick Byrne; 12 June 1913 Dublin, Ireland
- Died: 26 July 1952 (aged 39) Dublin, Ireland
- Party: Independent
- Parent: Alfie Byrne (father)
- Relatives: Thomas Byrne (brother); Patrick Byrne (brother)

Alfred Patrick Byrne (12 June 1913 – 26 July 1952) was an Irish politician. A clerk by profession, he was elected to Dáil Éireann as an independent Teachta Dála (TD) for Dublin North-West at the 1937 general election. He was re-elected at the 1938 and 1943 general elections but lost his seat at the 1944 general election.

He re-gained his seat at the 1948 general election and was re-elected at the 1951 general election. He died in 1952, and the subsequent by-election on 12 November 1952 was won by his brother Thomas Byrne.

His father Alfie Byrne was an MP, TD, Senator and Lord Mayor of Dublin. Another brother Patrick Byrne was also a TD.

== See also ==
- Families in the Oireachtas

Honorary titles
Preceded by ?	Baby of the Dáil; 1937–1943	Succeeded by Oliver J. Flanagan

Dáil	Election	Deputy (Party)	Deputy (Party)	Deputy (Party)	Deputy (Party)
2nd	1921	Philip Cosgrave (SF)	Joseph McGrath (SF)	Richard Mulcahy (SF)	Michael Staines (SF)
3rd	1922	Philip Cosgrave (PT-SF)	Joseph McGrath (PT-SF)	Richard Mulcahy (PT-SF)	Michael Staines (PT-SF)
4th	1923	Constituency abolished. See Dublin North			

Dáil	Election	Deputy (Party)	Deputy (Party)	Deputy (Party)	Deputy (Party)	Deputy (Party)
9th	1937	Seán T. O'Kelly (FF)	A. P. Byrne (Ind.)	Cormac Breathnach (FF)	Patrick McGilligan (FG)	Archie Heron (Lab)
10th	1938	Seán T. O'Kelly (FF)	A. P. Byrne (Ind.)	Cormac Breathnach (FF)	Patrick McGilligan (FG)	Eamonn Cooney (FF)
11th	1943	Seán T. O'Kelly (FF)	A. P. Byrne (Ind.)	Cormac Breathnach (FF)	Patrick McGilligan (FG)	Martin O'Sullivan (Lab)
12th	1944	Seán T. O'Kelly (FF)	John S. O'Connor (FF)	Cormac Breathnach (FF)	Patrick McGilligan (FG)	Martin O'Sullivan (Lab)
12th	1945 by-election	Vivion de Valera (FF)	John S. O'Connor (FF)	Cormac Breathnach (FF)	Patrick McGilligan (FG)	Martin O'Sullivan (Lab)
13th	1948	Mick Fitzpatrick (CnaP)	A. P. Byrne (Ind.)	Cormac Breathnach (FF)	3 seats from 1948 to 1969	
14th	1951	Declan Costello (FG)	A. P. Byrne (Ind.)	Cormac Breathnach (FF)	3 seats from 1948 to 1969	
14th	1952 by-election	Declan Costello (FG)	Thomas Byrne (Ind.)	Cormac Breathnach (FF)	3 seats from 1948 to 1969	
15th	1954	Declan Costello (FG)	Thomas Byrne (Ind.)	Richard Gogan (FF)	3 seats from 1948 to 1969	
16th	1957	Declan Costello (FG)	Thomas Byrne (Ind.)	Richard Gogan (FF)	3 seats from 1948 to 1969	
17th	1961	Declan Costello (FG)	Michael Mullen (Lab)	Richard Gogan (FF)	3 seats from 1948 to 1969	
18th	1965	Declan Costello (FG)	Michael Mullen (Lab)	Richard Gogan (FF)	3 seats from 1948 to 1969	
19th	1969	Hugh Byrne (FG)	Jim Tunney (FF)	Richard Gogan (FF)	David Thornley (Lab)	4 seats from 1969 to 1977
20th	1973	Hugh Byrne (FG)	Jim Tunney (FF)	Richard Gogan (FF)	David Thornley (Lab)	4 seats from 1969 to 1977
21st	1977	Constituency abolished. See Dublin Finglas and Dublin Cabra				

Dáil	Election	Deputy (Party)	Deputy (Party)	Deputy (Party)	Deputy (Party)
22nd	1981	Jim Tunney (FF)	Michael Barrett (FF)	Mary Flaherty (FG)	Hugh Byrne (FG)
23rd	1982 (Feb)	Jim Tunney (FF)	Michael Barrett (FF)	Mary Flaherty (FG)	Proinsias De Rossa (WP)
24th	1982 (Nov)	Jim Tunney (FF)	Michael Barrett (FF)	Mary Flaherty (FG)	Proinsias De Rossa (WP)
25th	1987	Jim Tunney (FF)	Michael Barrett (FF)	Mary Flaherty (FG)	Proinsias De Rossa (WP)
26th	1989	Jim Tunney (FF)	Michael Barrett (FF)	Mary Flaherty (FG)	Proinsias De Rossa (WP)
27th	1992	Noel Ahern (FF)	Róisín Shortall (Lab)	Mary Flaherty (FG)	Proinsias De Rossa (DL)
28th	1997	Noel Ahern (FF)	Róisín Shortall (Lab)	Pat Carey (FF)	Proinsias De Rossa (DL)
29th	2002	Noel Ahern (FF)	Róisín Shortall (Lab)	Pat Carey (FF)	3 seats from 2002
30th	2007	Noel Ahern (FF)	Róisín Shortall (Lab)	Pat Carey (FF)	3 seats from 2002
31st	2011	Dessie Ellis (SF)	Róisín Shortall (Lab)	John Lyons (Lab)	3 seats from 2002
32nd	2016	Dessie Ellis (SF)	Róisín Shortall (SD)	Noel Rock (FG)	3 seats from 2002
33rd	2020	Dessie Ellis (SF)	Róisín Shortall (SD)	Paul McAuliffe (FF)	3 seats from 2002
34th	2024	Dessie Ellis (SF)	Rory Hearne (SD)	Paul McAuliffe (FF)	3 seats from 2002
