= Timothy Harrington =

Irish politician (1851–1910)

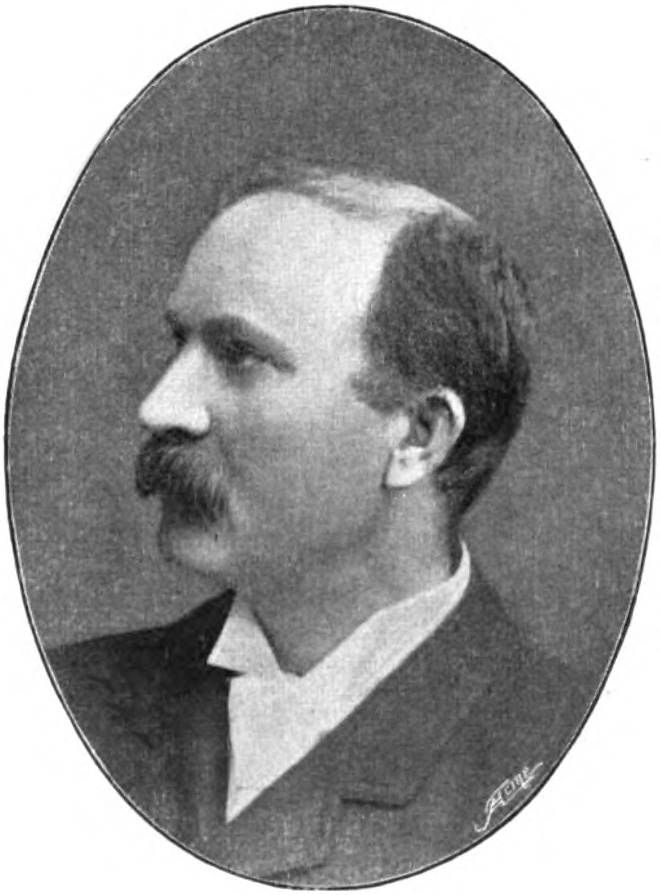
- Harrington in 1895

Member of Parliament for Dublin Harbour
- In office 1 December 1885 – 12 March 1910
- Preceded by: New office
- Succeeded by: William Abraham

Member of Parliament for County Westmeath
- In office 24 February 1883 – 25 November 1885
- Preceded by: Timothy Daniel Sullivan; Henry Joseph Gill
- Succeeded by: Office abolished

Lord Mayor of Dublin
- In office 1901–1904
- Preceded by: Thomas Pile
- Succeeded by: Joseph Hutchinson

Personal details
- Born: 1851 Bantry, County Cork, Ireland
- Died: 10 March 1910 (aged 58–59) Dublin, Ireland
- Party: Irish Parliamentary Party
- Spouse: Elizabeth O'Neill (m. 1892)
- Children: 5
- Education: Catholic University of Ireland; Trinity College Dublin

Timothy Charles Harrington (1851 – 12 March 1910) was an Irish journalist, barrister, nationalist politician and Member of Parliament (MP) in the House of Commons of the United Kingdom.

== Biography ==
He was born in Castletownbere, County Cork in 1851; son of Denis Harrington and his wife, Eileen (née O'Sullivan). He was educated at the Catholic University of Ireland and Trinity College Dublin.

As a member of the Irish Parliamentary Party, he represented County Westmeath from February 1883 to November 1885. In 1885 he was elected for the new constituency of Dublin Harbour, which he represented until his death in 1910. He served as Lord Mayor of Dublin three times from 1901 to 1904.

He owned two newspapers, United Ireland and the Kerry Sentinel and was a member of the so-called Bantry band of prominent nationalist politicians from the Bantry vicinity. They were also more pejoratively known as the Pope's brass band. Tim Healy was another prominent member of this unofficial group.

In 1884, Harrington published a pamphlet, "Maamtrasna Massacres - Impeachment of the Trials" in which he dismantled the Crown Prosecution's case against the eight men accused of the murders of the Joyce family on 17 August 1882. He provided evidence that Crown Prosecutor George Bolton had deliberately suppressed evidence that would have acquitted Myles Joyce, who was hanged, and four men who were sentenced to twenty years of penal servitude.

Harrington was secretary and chief organiser of the Irish National League (INL), a supporter of Charles Stewart Parnell and was largely responsible for devising the agrarian Plan of Campaign in 1886. He became a Parnellite Nationalist when the party split in 1891 continuing as secretary of the INL. In 1897 he proclaimed himself an Independent Nationalist and sided with William O'Brien's United Irish League from its early days. He was briefly considered as a possible alternative to John Redmond as leader of the re-united Irish Parliamentary Party in 1900 when he stood in the general election that year as a Nationalist again.

Thereafter he became excluded from Redmond's closed circle of confidants, he retained sympathy with O'Brien, and represented the interests of the tenant farmers at the 1902 Land Conference negotiations which led to the enactment of the unprecedented Wyndham Land Purchase (Ireland) Act 1903.

Harrington is celebrated by a statue erected in 2001 at the east end of Castletownbere near the Millbrook bar.

On Saturday, 7 September 1901, the Lord Mayor of Dublin, Harrington kicked off at the official ceremony to open Bohemian FC's new home, Dalymount Park.

== Sources ==
- Who's Who of British Members of Parliament, Vol. II 1886–1918, edited by M. Stenton & S. Lees (The Harvester Press 1978)
- Who's Who of "The Long Gestation" Irish Nationalist Life 1891–1918, Patrick Maume, Gill & Macmillan (1999) ISBN 0-7171-2744-3

Parliament of the United Kingdom
Preceded by Timothy Daniel Sullivan; Henry Joseph Gill	Member of Parliament for County Westmeath; 1883–1885; With: Timothy Daniel Sullivan	Constituency divided
New constituency	Member of Parliament for Dublin Harbour; 1885–1910	Succeeded by William Abraham
Civic offices
Preceded by Thomas Pile	Lord Mayor of Dublin; 1901–1904	Succeeded by Joseph Hutchinson
