= 1956 Dublin North-East by-election =

By-election to the 15th Dáil

- 30 April 1956
- Turnout: 32,079 (49.4%)
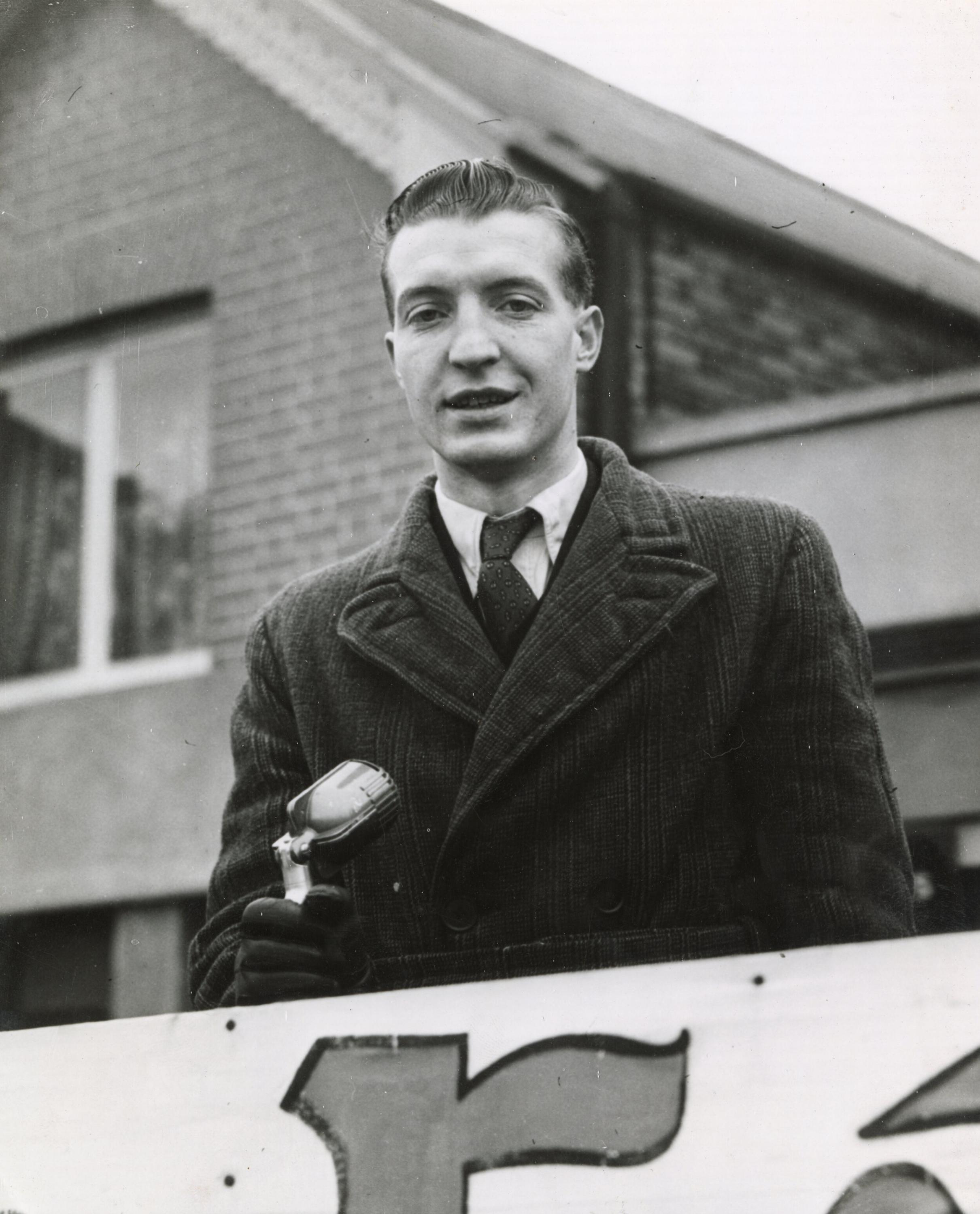
	Byrne
Nominee	Patrick Byrne	Charles Haughey
Party	Independent	Fianna Fáil
First preferences	18,129	13,950
Percentage	56.5%	43.5%
TD before election
Alfie Byrne
Independent
TD after election
Patrick Byrne
Independent

A Dáil by-election was held in the constituency of Dublin North-East in Ireland on Monday, 30 April 1956, to fill a vacancy in the 15th Dáil. It followed the death of independent Teachta Dála (TD) Alfie Byrne on 13 March 1956.

The writ of election to fill the vacancy was agreed by the Dáil on 10 April 1956.

The by-election was won by the independent candidate Patrick Byrne, son of the deceased TD, Alfie Byrne.

It was held on the same day as the 1956 Leix–Offaly by-election.

== Result ==
1956 Dublin North-East by-election
Party	Candidate	FPv%	Count
Party	Candidate	FPv%	1
Independent	Patrick Byrne	56.5	18,129
Fianna Fáil	Charles Haughey	43.5	13,950
Electorate: 64,903 Valid: 32,079 Quota: 16,040 Turnout: 49.4%

Byrne and Haughey were both elected for Dublin North-East at the 1957 general election. Haughey later served as a TD until 1992, and in several government positions, culminating as Taoiseach three times between 1979 and 1992.
