= 1956 Cork Borough by-election =

By-election to the 15th Dáil

- 2 August 1956
- Turnout: 35,568 (56.0%)
	Galvin	Sheehan	Desmond
Nominee	John Galvin	Michael Sheehan	Cornelius Desmond
Party	Fianna Fáil	Fine Gael	Labour
First preferences	18,704	10,166	3,919
Percentage	52.6%	28.6%	11.0%
TD before election
Patrick McGrath
Fianna Fáil
TD after election
John Galvin
Fianna Fáil

A Dáil by-election was held in the constituency of Cork Borough in Ireland on Thursday, 2 August 1956, to fill a vacancy in the 15th Dáil. It followed the death of Fianna Fáil Teachta Dála (TD) Patrick McGrath on 20 June 1956.

The writ of election to fill the vacancy was agreed by the Dáil on 10 July 1956.

The by-election was won by the Fianna Fáil candidate John Galvin.

== Result ==
1956 Cork Borough by-election
Party	Candidate	FPv%	Count
Party	Candidate	FPv%	1
Fianna Fáil	John Galvin	52.6	18,704
Fine Gael	Michael Sheehan	28.6	10,166
Labour	Cornelius Desmond	11.0	3,919
Independent	Seán Twomey	4.6	1,630
Independent	John Reidy	3.2	1,149
Electorate: 63,495 Valid: 35,568 Quota: 17,785 Turnout: 56.0%
