= 1956 Kerry North by-election =

By-election to the 15th Dáil

- 29 February 1956
- Turnout: 34,004 (74.2%)
	O'Connor	Moloney
Nominee	Kathleen O'Connor	Daniel Moloney
Party	Clann na Poblachta	Fianna Fáil
First preferences	18,176	15,828
Percentage	53.4%	46.6%
TD before election
Johnny Connor
Clann na Poblachta
TD after election
Kathleen O'Connor
Clann na Poblachta

A Dáil by-election was held in the constituency of Kerry North in Ireland on Wednesday, 29 February 1956, to fill a vacancy in the 15th Dáil. It followed the death of Clann na Poblachta Teachta Dála (TD) Johnny Connor on 11 December 1955.

The writ of election to fill the vacancy was agreed by the Dáil on 8 February 1956.

The by-election was won by the Clann na Poblachta candidate Kathleen O'Connor, daughter of the deceased TD, Johnny Connor.

Kathleen O'Connor was only 21 years old when elected. She became the youngest TD ever at that time, and was still not registered to vote. She did not stand at the 1957 general election, and retired from politics.

== Result ==
1956 Kerry North by-election
Party	Candidate	FPv%	Count
Party	Candidate	FPv%	1
Clann na Poblachta	Kathleen O'Connor	53.4	18,176
Fianna Fáil	Daniel Moloney	46.6	15,828
Electorate: 45,841 Valid: 34,004 Quota: 17,003 Turnout: 74.2%
