= Martin Medlar =

Irish politician (1899–1965)

Teachta Dála
- In office November 1956 – April 1965
- Constituency: Carlow–Kilkenny

Personal details
- Born: 4 December 1899 Waterford, Ireland
- Died: 4 June 1965 (aged 65) Waterford, Ireland
- Party: Fianna Fáil

Martin Medlar (4 December 1899 – 4 June 1965) was an Irish Fianna Fáil politician who served as a Teachta Dála (TD) for the Carlow–Kilkenny constituency from 1956 to 1965.

A farmer by profession, he was elected to Dáil Éireann as a Fianna Fáil TD for the Carlow–Kilkenny constituency at the 1956 by-election caused by the death of Thomas Walsh of Fianna Fáil. He was re-elected at the 1957 and 1961 general elections. He lost his seat at the 1965 general election.

Dáil	Election	Deputy (Party)	Deputy (Party)	Deputy (Party)	Deputy (Party)	Deputy (Party)
2nd	1921	Edward Aylward (SF)	W. T. Cosgrave (SF)	James Lennon (SF)	Gearóid O'Sullivan (SF)	4 seats 1921–1923
3rd	1922	Patrick Gaffney (Lab)	W. T. Cosgrave (PT-SF)	Denis Gorey (FP)	Gearóid O'Sullivan (PT-SF)	4 seats 1921–1923
4th	1923	Edward Doyle (Lab)	W. T. Cosgrave (CnaG)	Denis Gorey (FP)	Michael Shelly (Rep)	Seán Gibbons (CnaG)
4th	1925 by-election	Edward Doyle (Lab)	W. T. Cosgrave (CnaG)	Denis Gorey (FP)	Michael Shelly (Rep)	Thomas Bolger (CnaG)
5th	1927 (Jun)	Edward Doyle (Lab)	W. T. Cosgrave (CnaG)	Denis Gorey (CnaG)	Thomas Derrig (FF)	Richard Holohan (FP)
6th	1927 (Sep)	Edward Doyle (Lab)	W. T. Cosgrave (CnaG)	Peter de Loughry (CnaG)	Thomas Derrig (FF)	Richard Holohan (FP)
6th	1927 by-election	Edward Doyle (Lab)	Denis Gorey (CnaG)	Peter de Loughry (CnaG)	Thomas Derrig (FF)	Richard Holohan (FP)
7th	1932	Francis Humphreys (FF)	Denis Gorey (CnaG)	Desmond FitzGerald (CnaG)	Thomas Derrig (FF)	Seán Gibbons (FF)
8th	1933	James Pattison (Lab)	Richard Holohan (NCP)	Desmond FitzGerald (CnaG)	Thomas Derrig (FF)	Seán Gibbons (FF)
9th	1937	Constituency abolished. See Kilkenny and Carlow–Kildare				

Dáil	Election	Deputy (Party)	Deputy (Party)	Deputy (Party)	Deputy (Party)	Deputy (Party)
13th	1948	James Pattison (NLP)	Thomas Walsh (FF)	Thomas Derrig (FF)	Joseph Hughes (FG)	Patrick Crotty (FG)
14th	1951	Francis Humphreys (FF)	Thomas Walsh (FF)	Thomas Derrig (FF)	Joseph Hughes (FG)	Patrick Crotty (FG)
15th	1954	James Pattison (Lab)	Thomas Walsh (FF)	Thomas Derrig (FF)	Joseph Hughes (FG)	Patrick Crotty (FG)
15th	1956 by-election	James Pattison (Lab)	Martin Medlar (FF)	Thomas Derrig (FF)	Joseph Hughes (FG)	Patrick Crotty (FG)
16th	1957	Francis Humphreys (FF)	Martin Medlar (FF)	Jim Gibbons (FF)	Joseph Hughes (FG)	Patrick Crotty (FG)
16th	1960 by-election	Patrick Teehan (FF)	Martin Medlar (FF)	Jim Gibbons (FF)	Joseph Hughes (FG)	Patrick Crotty (FG)
17th	1961	Séamus Pattison (Lab)	Martin Medlar (FF)	Jim Gibbons (FF)	Desmond Governey (FG)	Patrick Crotty (FG)
18th	1965	Séamus Pattison (Lab)	Tom Nolan (FF)	Jim Gibbons (FF)	Desmond Governey (FG)	Patrick Crotty (FG)
19th	1969	Séamus Pattison (Lab)	Tom Nolan (FF)	Jim Gibbons (FF)	Desmond Governey (FG)	Kieran Crotty (FG)
20th	1973	Séamus Pattison (Lab)	Tom Nolan (FF)	Jim Gibbons (FF)	Desmond Governey (FG)	Kieran Crotty (FG)
21st	1977	Séamus Pattison (Lab)	Tom Nolan (FF)	Jim Gibbons (FF)	Liam Aylward (FF)	Kieran Crotty (FG)
22nd	1981	Séamus Pattison (Lab)	Tom Nolan (FF)	Desmond Governey (FG)	Liam Aylward (FF)	Kieran Crotty (FG)
23rd	1982 (Feb)	Séamus Pattison (Lab)	Jim Gibbons (FF)	Desmond Governey (FG)	Liam Aylward (FF)	Kieran Crotty (FG)
24th	1982 (Nov)	Séamus Pattison (Lab)	M. J. Nolan (FF)	Dick Dowling (FG)	Liam Aylward (FF)	Kieran Crotty (FG)
25th	1987	Séamus Pattison (Lab)	M. J. Nolan (FF)	Martin Gibbons (PDs)	Liam Aylward (FF)	Kieran Crotty (FG)
26th	1989	Séamus Pattison (Lab)	M. J. Nolan (FF)	Phil Hogan (FG)	Liam Aylward (FF)	John Browne (FG)
27th	1992	Séamus Pattison (Lab)	M. J. Nolan (FF)	Phil Hogan (FG)	Liam Aylward (FF)	John Browne (FG)
28th	1997	Séamus Pattison (Lab)	John McGuinness (FF)	Phil Hogan (FG)	Liam Aylward (FF)	John Browne (FG)
29th	2002	Séamus Pattison (Lab)	John McGuinness (FF)	Phil Hogan (FG)	Liam Aylward (FF)	M. J. Nolan (FF)
30th	2007	Mary White (GP)	John McGuinness (FF)	Phil Hogan (FG)	Bobby Aylward (FF)	M. J. Nolan (FF)
31st	2011	Ann Phelan (Lab)	John McGuinness (FF)	Phil Hogan (FG)	John Paul Phelan (FG)	Pat Deering (FG)
31st	2015 by-election	Ann Phelan (Lab)	John McGuinness (FF)	Bobby Aylward (FF)	John Paul Phelan (FG)	Pat Deering (FG)
32nd	2016	Kathleen Funchion (SF)	John McGuinness (FF)	Bobby Aylward (FF)	John Paul Phelan (FG)	Pat Deering (FG)
33rd	2020	Kathleen Funchion (SF)	John McGuinness (FF)	Jennifer Murnane O'Connor (FF)	John Paul Phelan (FG)	Malcolm Noonan (GP)
34th	2024	Natasha Newsome Drennan (SF)	John McGuinness (FF)	Jennifer Murnane O'Connor (FF)	Catherine Callaghan (FG)	Peter "Chap" Cleere (FF)
