= Kathleen O'Connor (politician) =

Irish politician (1934–2017)

- O'Connor, c. 1956

Teachta Dála
- In office February 1956 – March 1957
- Constituency: Kerry North

Personal details
- Born: 30 July 1934 Tralee, County Kerry, Ireland
- Died: 13 December 2017 (aged 83) Cork, Ireland
- Party: Clann na Poblachta
- Parent: Johnny Connor (father)
- Education: Carysfort College

Kathleen O'Connor (30 July 1934 – 13 December 2017) was an Irish Clann na Poblachta politician who served as a Teachta Dála (TD) for the Kerry North constituency from 1956 to 1957.

In 1954, her father Johnny Connor had been elected to the Dáil on his third attempt as a candidate for Clann na Poblachta. During her father's stint as a TD, she had also been in Dublin training to become a National School teacher, at Carysfort College and she taught at Meen National School, Knocknagoshel. During her spare time she would offer work at her father's office as his de facto secretary and thus was familiar with the ins and outs of his job. Tragedy struck in December 1955, when Johnny Connor was killed in a traffic accident as he was returning to his home in County Kerry.

Following the funeral, Seán MacBride, leader of Clann na Poblachta, asked O'Connor's mother, Margaret, to stand in the forthcoming by-election for her husband's seat. When she refused, MacBride turned to O'Connor and pleaded with her to stand, saying that she was Clann na Poblachta's only hope for survival, as the party's fortunes had greatly soured after the first Inter-Party Government of 1951. Also, the loss of her father's seat to a Fianna Fáil candidate could have caused the collapse of the Government of the 15th Dáil, which held only a small majority of seats.

The by-election for his Dáil seat was held on 29 February 1956. All of the parties that were members of the government (Fine Gael, Labour, and Clann na Talmhan) agreed not to run candidates as a means to bolster O'Connor, and on top of this the leaders of all three parties (John A. Costello, William Norton, Joseph Blowick) visited the constituency during the campaign. In response, Fianna Fáil also brought in party members to campaign and the Taoiseach Éamon de Valera. It all ended with a victory for O'Connor, then only 21-years-old. She became the youngest TD ever at that time and was in fact so young she was still not registered to vote.

She did not stand at the 1957 general election, and retired from politics. She was 21 years, 7 months old when elected, making her the fourth youngest ever person elected to the Dáil and the youngest ever female TD. She was the first woman to succeed her father at a by-election to the Dáil and the first woman elected to the Dáil in the Kerry North constituency.

== See also ==
- Families in the Oireachtas

Honorary titles
Preceded by Declan Costello	Baby of the Dáil; 1956–1957	Succeeded by Brigid Hogan

Dáil	Election	Deputy (Party)	Deputy (Party)	Deputy (Party)	Deputy (Party)
9th	1937	Stephen Fuller (FF)	Tom McEllistrim, Snr (FF)	John O'Sullivan (FG)	Eamon Kissane (FF)
10th	1938	Stephen Fuller (FF)	Tom McEllistrim, Snr (FF)	John O'Sullivan (FG)	Eamon Kissane (FF)
11th	1943	Dan Spring (Lab)	Tom McEllistrim, Snr (FF)	Patrick Finucane (CnaT)	Eamon Kissane (FF)
12th	1944	Dan Spring (NLP)	Tom McEllistrim, Snr (FF)	Patrick Finucane (CnaT)	Eamon Kissane (FF)
13th	1948	Dan Spring (NLP)	Tom McEllistrim, Snr (FF)	Patrick Finucane (CnaT)	Eamon Kissane (FF)
14th	1951	Dan Spring (Lab)	Tom McEllistrim, Snr (FF)	Patrick Finucane (Ind.)	John Lynch (FG)
15th	1954	Dan Spring (Lab)	Tom McEllistrim, Snr (FF)	Patrick Finucane (CnaT)	Johnny Connor (CnaP)
15th	1956 by-election	Dan Spring (Lab)	Tom McEllistrim, Snr (FF)	Patrick Finucane (CnaT)	Kathleen O'Connor (CnaP)
16th	1957	Dan Spring (Lab)	Tom McEllistrim, Snr (FF)	Patrick Finucane (Ind.)	Daniel Moloney (FF)
17th	1961	Dan Spring (Lab)	Tom McEllistrim, Snr (FF)	Patrick Finucane (Ind.)	3 seats from 1961
18th	1965	Dan Spring (Lab)	Tom McEllistrim, Snr (FF)	Patrick Finucane (Ind.)	3 seats from 1961
19th	1969	Dan Spring (Lab)	Gerard Lynch (FG)	Tom McEllistrim, Jnr (FF)	3 seats from 1961
20th	1973	Dan Spring (Lab)	Gerard Lynch (FG)	Tom McEllistrim, Jnr (FF)	3 seats from 1961
21st	1977	Dan Spring (Lab)	Kit Ahern (FF)	Tom McEllistrim, Jnr (FF)	3 seats from 1961
22nd	1981	Dick Spring (Lab)	Denis Foley (FF)	Tom McEllistrim, Jnr (FF)	3 seats from 1961
23rd	1982 (Feb)	Dick Spring (Lab)	Denis Foley (FF)	Tom McEllistrim, Jnr (FF)	3 seats from 1961
24th	1982 (Nov)	Dick Spring (Lab)	Denis Foley (FF)	Tom McEllistrim, Jnr (FF)	3 seats from 1961
25th	1987	Dick Spring (Lab)	Denis Foley (FF)	Jimmy Deenihan (FG)	3 seats from 1961
26th	1989	Dick Spring (Lab)	Tom McEllistrim, Jnr (FF)	Jimmy Deenihan (FG)	3 seats from 1961
27th	1992	Dick Spring (Lab)	Denis Foley (FF)	Jimmy Deenihan (FG)	3 seats from 1961
28th	1997	Dick Spring (Lab)	Denis Foley (FF)	Jimmy Deenihan (FG)	3 seats from 1961
29th	2002	Martin Ferris (SF)	Tom McEllistrim (FF)	Jimmy Deenihan (FG)	3 seats from 1961
30th	2007	Martin Ferris (SF)	Tom McEllistrim (FF)	Jimmy Deenihan (FG)	3 seats from 1961
31st	2011	Constituency abolished. See Kerry North–West Limerick			
