= Johnny Connor =

Irish politician (1899–1955)

Teachta Dála
- In office May 1954 – 11 December 1955
- Constituency: Kerry North

Personal details
- Born: 1 July 1899 Tralee, County Kerry, Ireland
- Died: 11 December 1955 (aged 56) Knocknagoshel, County Kerry, Ireland
- Party: Clann na Poblachta
- Spouse: Margaret Corkery (m. 1924)
- Children: Kathleen

Military service
- Branch/service: Irish Republican Army; Anti-Treaty IRA
- Unit: Kerry No. 1 Brigade; Kerry No. 2 Brigade
- Battles/wars: Irish War of Independence; Irish Civil War

John O'Connor (1 July 1899 – 11 December 1955), known politically as Johnny Connor, was an Irish Clann na Poblachta politician who served as a Teachta Dála (TD) for the Kerry North constituency from 1954 to 1955.

== Soldier ==
O'Connor was born in Poulawaddra, Farmer's Bridge near Tralee, County Kerry, in July 1899. He left school at 15, and not long afterwards joined the Irish Volunteers, a military organisation who sought to oppose the Ulster Volunteers if they attempted to resist an All-Ireland parliament upon the implementation of Home Rule in Ireland. During the Irish War of Independence he joined the No. 1 Brigade of the Kerry Irish Republican Army, before later transferring to a Flying column in Kerry Brigade No.2, serving under Dan Allman. During this time he became an associate of future Fianna Fáil TD Tom McEllistrim. O'Connor was reputedly a skilled operator of a Lewis Machine Gun, earning him the moniker of "Machine Gun Connor". When the Irish Civil War broke out, O'Connor took the Anti-Treaty IRA side. In 1923, he was captured by Pro-Treaty forces and imprisoned. Following his release from prison, O'Connor emigrated to Chicago until 1930, when he returned to Kerry to take over his family's farm. In February 1933, Connor was charged with weapons possession in Tralee Court and made the following statement: "As a soldier of the Irish Republican Army I refuse to recognise the jurisdiction of this court."

In 1929, he married Margaret Corkery. During the Emergency (the era by the which World War II was referred to in Ireland), he was once again jailed (February 1941) with Jim Crofton on charges of still being active in the IRA, this time by a Fianna Fáil government. During this time he was in the company of others charged with the same crime and became politically interested. Following his release, he joined Clann na Poblachta, which had strong IRA links and was led by former IRA Chief-of-Staff Seán MacBride.

== Politician ==
O'Connor first stood for election in the 1948 general election as a Clann na Poblachta candidate for Kerry North, where he strategically dropped the "O" from his surname in order to secure a higher place on the ballot paper, which are sorted alphabetically. He would continue this for the entirety of his political career. He was not successful at his first attempt at the Dáil, losing out to, amongst others, his old comrade Tom McEllistrim. He was, however, elected to Kerry County Council in October 1948, which was seen as both a boost to him personally but also Clann na Poblachta, signalling an appetite for change amongst the voters.

He was elected to Dáil Éireann on his third attempt, at the 1954 general election as a Clann na Poblachta TD for the Kerry North constituency, unseating sitting Fine Gael TD John Lynch. He was the first Clann na Poblachta TD elected in County Kerry. Clann na Poblachta had won ten seats at the 1948 general election, but after the collapse of the first inter-party government, it had been reduced to two TDs at the 1951 general election. Connor's victory was the party's only gain in 1954.

During Connor's time as TD, his daughter Kathleen O'Connor acted as his de facto secretary. Kathleen was studying to become a teacher at a college in Dublin at the time and used her spare hours to act as his assistant.

Connor was killed in a road accident near Abbeyfeale in December 1955. His funeral was attended by numerous high-profile politicians from across the country, including Taoiseach John A. Costello, Richard Mulcahy and leading figures from all the major political parties. John A. Costello gave a eulogy, citing Connor's honesty, sincerity, integrity and warmth as his best qualities.

Following the funeral, Seán MacBride asked Connor's widow to stand in the forthcoming by-election for her husband's seat. When she refused, MacBride turned to Kathleen and pleaded with her to stand, saying that she was Clann na Poblachta's only hope for survival, as the party's fortunes had greatly soured after the first Inter-Party Government of 1951. The by-election for his Dáil seat was held on 29 February 1956 and resulted in victory for Kathleen, then only 21 years old. She became the youngest TD ever at that time and was in fact so young she was still not registered to vote.

She stood down from the Dáil at the 1957 general election.

== See also ==
- Families in the Oireachtas

Dáil	Election	Deputy (Party)	Deputy (Party)	Deputy (Party)	Deputy (Party)
9th	1937	Stephen Fuller (FF)	Tom McEllistrim, Snr (FF)	John O'Sullivan (FG)	Eamon Kissane (FF)
10th	1938	Stephen Fuller (FF)	Tom McEllistrim, Snr (FF)	John O'Sullivan (FG)	Eamon Kissane (FF)
11th	1943	Dan Spring (Lab)	Tom McEllistrim, Snr (FF)	Patrick Finucane (CnaT)	Eamon Kissane (FF)
12th	1944	Dan Spring (NLP)	Tom McEllistrim, Snr (FF)	Patrick Finucane (CnaT)	Eamon Kissane (FF)
13th	1948	Dan Spring (NLP)	Tom McEllistrim, Snr (FF)	Patrick Finucane (CnaT)	Eamon Kissane (FF)
14th	1951	Dan Spring (Lab)	Tom McEllistrim, Snr (FF)	Patrick Finucane (Ind.)	John Lynch (FG)
15th	1954	Dan Spring (Lab)	Tom McEllistrim, Snr (FF)	Patrick Finucane (CnaT)	Johnny Connor (CnaP)
15th	1956 by-election	Dan Spring (Lab)	Tom McEllistrim, Snr (FF)	Patrick Finucane (CnaT)	Kathleen O'Connor (CnaP)
16th	1957	Dan Spring (Lab)	Tom McEllistrim, Snr (FF)	Patrick Finucane (Ind.)	Daniel Moloney (FF)
17th	1961	Dan Spring (Lab)	Tom McEllistrim, Snr (FF)	Patrick Finucane (Ind.)	3 seats from 1961
18th	1965	Dan Spring (Lab)	Tom McEllistrim, Snr (FF)	Patrick Finucane (Ind.)	3 seats from 1961
19th	1969	Dan Spring (Lab)	Gerard Lynch (FG)	Tom McEllistrim, Jnr (FF)	3 seats from 1961
20th	1973	Dan Spring (Lab)	Gerard Lynch (FG)	Tom McEllistrim, Jnr (FF)	3 seats from 1961
21st	1977	Dan Spring (Lab)	Kit Ahern (FF)	Tom McEllistrim, Jnr (FF)	3 seats from 1961
22nd	1981	Dick Spring (Lab)	Denis Foley (FF)	Tom McEllistrim, Jnr (FF)	3 seats from 1961
23rd	1982 (Feb)	Dick Spring (Lab)	Denis Foley (FF)	Tom McEllistrim, Jnr (FF)	3 seats from 1961
24th	1982 (Nov)	Dick Spring (Lab)	Denis Foley (FF)	Tom McEllistrim, Jnr (FF)	3 seats from 1961
25th	1987	Dick Spring (Lab)	Denis Foley (FF)	Jimmy Deenihan (FG)	3 seats from 1961
26th	1989	Dick Spring (Lab)	Tom McEllistrim, Jnr (FF)	Jimmy Deenihan (FG)	3 seats from 1961
27th	1992	Dick Spring (Lab)	Denis Foley (FF)	Jimmy Deenihan (FG)	3 seats from 1961
28th	1997	Dick Spring (Lab)	Denis Foley (FF)	Jimmy Deenihan (FG)	3 seats from 1961
29th	2002	Martin Ferris (SF)	Tom McEllistrim (FF)	Jimmy Deenihan (FG)	3 seats from 1961
30th	2007	Martin Ferris (SF)	Tom McEllistrim (FF)	Jimmy Deenihan (FG)	3 seats from 1961
31st	2011	Constituency abolished. See Kerry North–West Limerick			
