= Alfie Byrne =

Irish politician (1882–1956)

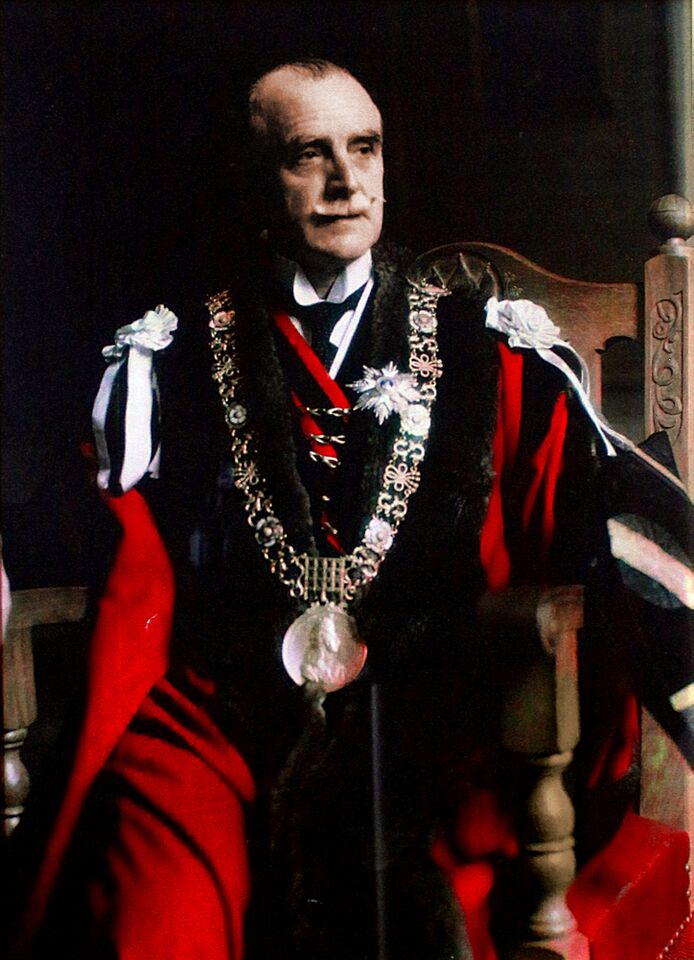
- Byrne in his mayoral robes

Teachta Dála
- In office July 1937 – 13 March 1956
- Constituency: Dublin North-East
- In office February 1932 – July 1937
- In office August 1923 – December 1928
- Constituency: Dublin North
- In office June 1922 – August 1923
- Constituency: Dublin Mid

Lord Mayor of Dublin
- In office June 1954 – May 1955
- Preceded by: Bernard Butler
- Succeeded by: Denis Larkin
- In office June 1930 – June 1939
- Preceded by: Laurence O'Neill (1924)
- Succeeded by: Kathleen Clarke

Senator
- In office 12 December 1928 – 9 December 1931

Member of Parliament
- In office October 1915 – December 1918
- Constituency: Dublin Harbour

Personal details
- Born: Alfred Byrne; 17 March 1882 Dublin, Ireland
- Died: 13 March 1956 (aged 73) Dublin, Ireland
- Party: Independent
- Other political affiliations: Irish Parliamentary Party
- Spouse: Elizabeth Heagney
- Children: 8, including Patrick, A. P. and Thomas

Alfred Byrne (17 March 1882 – 13 March 1956) was an Irish politician who served as a Member of Parliament (MP), as a Teachta Dála (TD) and as Lord Mayor of Dublin. He was known as the "Shaking Hand of Dublin".

== Early life ==
The second of seven children, he was the son of Thomas Byrne, an engineer, and Fanny Dowman. His childhood home was at 36 Seville Place, a terraced house with five rooms just off the North Strand in Dublin. Byrne dropped out of school at the age of 13, and was soon juggling jobs as a grocer's assistant and a bicycle mechanic. Eventually he used his savings to buy a pub on Talbot Street. He married Elizabeth Heagney in 1910.

== Early political career ==
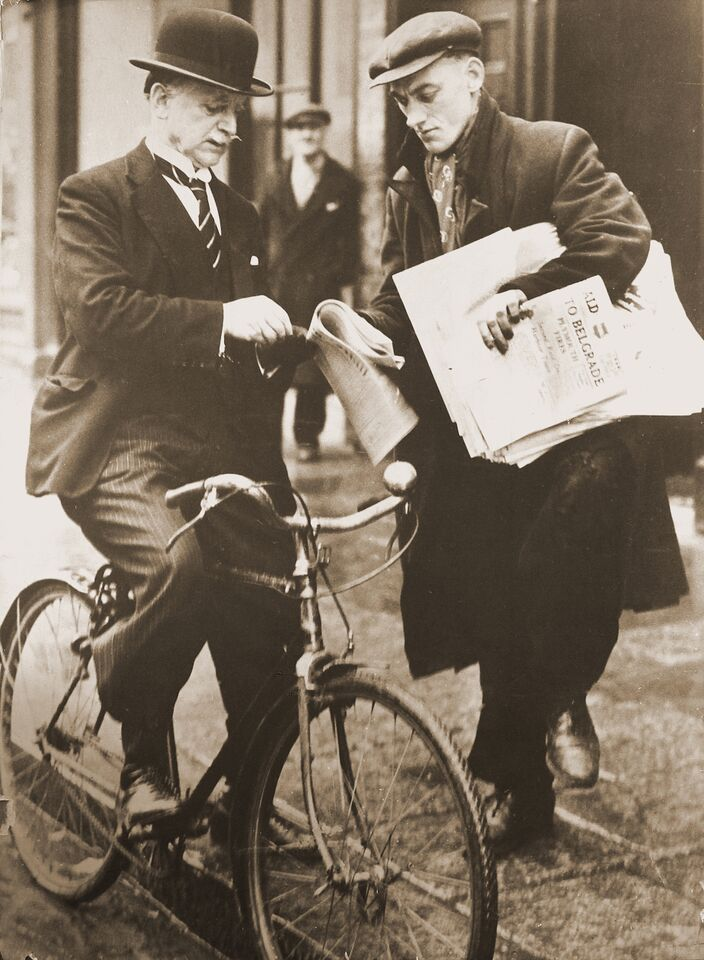
Alfie Byrne buying a newspaper

Byrne became an Alderman on Dublin Corporation in 1914. He was a member of the Dublin Port and Docks Board, a significant position for a politician from the Dublin Harbour constituency. In the records of the Oireachtas his occupation is given as company director. He was elected as MP for Dublin Harbour in a by-election on 1 October 1915, following the death of William Abraham, as a candidate of the Irish Parliamentary Party. The Easter Rising in 1916 was followed by the rapid decline of the Irish Parliamentary Party and the rise of Sinn Féin. At the 1918 general election Byrne was defeated by a Sinn Féin candidate, Philip Shanahan.

Byrne was elected as an independent TD supporting the Anglo-Irish Treaty for Dublin Mid at the general election to the 3rd Dáil in 1922. From 1923 to 1928 he represented Dublin North. He was an elected member of Seanad Éireann, for a six-year term from 1928. He vacated his Dáil seat on 4 December 1928. He resigned from the Seanad on 10 December 1931 and returned to the Dáil in 1932. He remained a TD until his death in 1956, representing Dublin North (1932–1937) and Dublin North-East (1937–1956). In several elections he secured more votes than any other politician in the country.

== Lord Mayor (1930–1939) ==
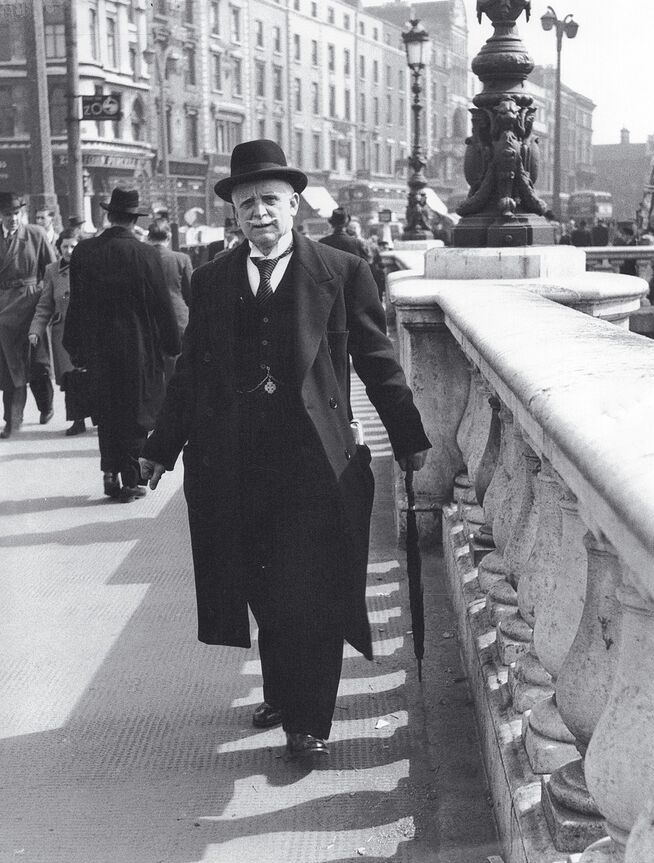
Byrne on O'Connell Bridge

Byrne was elected as Lord Mayor of Dublin in 1930, serving in the post for nine consecutive years. When cycling or walking around the city he dispensed lollipops to children, who were often seen chasing him down the street. With a handshake and a few words for all, his eternal canvassing soon earned him the first of his nicknames: the Shaking Hand of Dublin. Married with eight children, Byrne treated the people of Dublin as his second family. Every morning he would find up to fifty people waiting for him in the Mansion House. None had appointments. All were met. Byrne answered 15,000 letters in his first year as Lord Mayor. Many were from Dubliners looking for a job, a house, some advice or a reference. One morning in 1931 a journalist watched the Lord Mayor attend to his correspondence. Within an hour he accepted "seventeen invitations to public dinners, one invitation to a public entertainment and eight invitations to public functions." Then he dictated forty-three sympathetic letters to men and women looking for employment. In 1937, children between the ages of eight and eleven years old were being sentenced to spend up to five years in Industrial Schools. Their crime was stealing a few apples from an orchard. When Byrne said such sentences were "savage," a judge responded with a defence of the Industrial School system, urging an end to "ridiculous Mansion House mummery." Byrne stood firm: "For the punishment of trifling offences the home of the children is better than any institution." In 1938, Byrne was favoured by the press for the presidency of Ireland, a ceremonial role created in the new Constitution, but he was outgunned by the political establishment.

== Relations with the United States and the United Kingdom ==
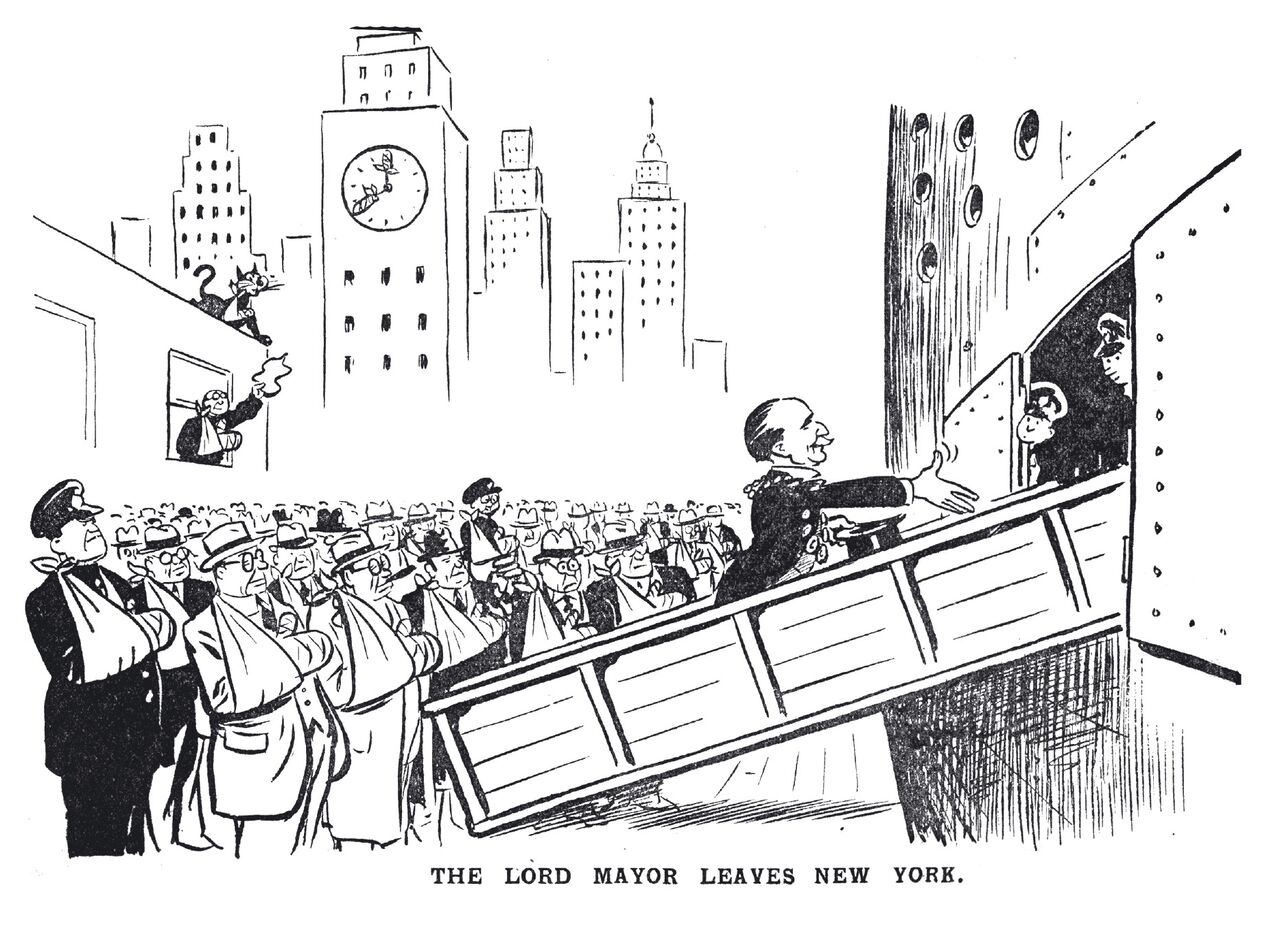
The Lord Mayor Leaves New York

When, in 1935, Byrne became the first Lord Mayor of Dublin to visit North America in 40 years, he was granted the freedom of Toronto, and The New York Times hailed the arrival of a "champion showman". Byrne often extended a hand of friendship to Britain. He also improved relations between Dublin (until recently the centre of British authority) and the rest of the country. One night Dublin Fire Brigade got an urgent call for assistance from Clones. As Lord Mayor, Byrne felt obliged to join the men on top of the fire engine as they set off on the 85-mile journey in the middle of the night.

== Anti-communist connections ==
In August 1936, Byrne addressed the inaugural meeting of the anti-communist Irish Christian Front, some of whose members later expressed anti-Semitic views. In 1938, as Lord Mayor, he presented a gift of a replica of the Ardagh Chalice to Italian naval cadets visiting Dublin on board two warships, who had been welcomed by the Irish government despite the protests of Dubliners. A photograph exists of Byrne giving a fascist salute along with Eoin O'Duffy, commander of the Blueshirts, around 1933.

== Final term as Lord Mayor (1954) ==
In 1954, Byrne was elected as Lord Mayor for a record tenth time. This time he did not live in the Mansion House, but stayed in Rathmines with his family, taking the bus to work each morning. He was just as devoted to the job. When flooding damaged 20,000 houses in Fairview and North Strand, he rose from his sick bed to organise a relief fund. Byrne's final term as Lord Mayor came to an end in 1955. Shortly afterwards, Trinity College Dublin awarded him an honorary Doctorate of Law, describing him as a "champion of the poor and needy, and a friend of all men."

== Death ==
Alfie Byrne died on 13 March 1956. An obituary in The Irish Times noted:

For more than forty years, he was a prominent figure in public life, serving his country and city with a rare and single-minded devotion. Himself a true Dubliner, he had a profound understanding of, and deep sympathy for, the needs and interests of his fellow-citizens, especially the poor. It is not too much to say that he lived for them, for wherever there was distress, he was promptly on the spot to ensure that assistance was made available with the utmost speed.

Byrne's funeral was the largest seen in Dublin for many years. The Evening Herald reported that "Traffic in O'Connell Street was held up for almost 20 minutes to allow the cortege of over 150 motor cars to pass, and at all the junctions along the route to Glasnevin people silently gathered to pay tribute to one of Dublin’s most famous sons". The Irish Times noted that "one of the largest groups of people gathered at the Five Lamps, one of the few places at which Alderman Byrne always made a speech during his election campaign for Dublin North-East." The Irish Press reported a tribute by the Taoiseach, John A Costello, "He had great personal charm and was known for his old-world courtliness both at home and abroad.... We mourn in the passing of Alfie Byrne the loss of an honoured and distinguished Irishman whose place in the hearts of his fellow countrymen was unique and who gave a lifetime of unselfish devotion to their service." The members of the Dáil stood and observed a short silence as a mark of respect. A telegram was sent to his widow from the Mayor of New York, Robert F. Wagner Jr., expressing deepest sympathy, and stating "that Ald. Byrne had attained high office of Lord Mayor many times, but he never lost contact with the poor and the underprivileged, whose champion he was".

== Legacy ==
The press called him the "Shaking Hand of Dublin", Alfred the Great, and The Lord Mayor of Ireland, but most people knew him simply as Alfie. As one of the most popular Dublin-born politicians of the 20th century, he did not write a memoir. The by-election caused by his death, was won by his son Patrick Byrne. Two other sons A. P. Byrne and Thomas Byrne were also TDs for various Dublin constituencies. Alfie Byrne Road in Clontarf is named after him. The Dublin Bay North branch of Young Fine Gael was renamed 'Alfie Byrne YFG'.

Alfie Byrne also holds the distinction of being the only person to serve as Councillor, Alderman, Lord Mayor of Dublin, MP, TD and Senator.

== See also ==
- Families in the Oireachtas

Civic offices
Vacant Position suspended Title last held by Laurence O'Neill (1924)	Lord Mayor of Dublin; 1930–1939	Succeeded by Kathleen Clarke
Preceded by Bernard Butler	Lord Mayor of Dublin; 1954–1955	Succeeded by Denis Larkin
Parliament of the United Kingdom
Preceded by William Abraham	Member of Parliament for Dublin Harbour; 1915–1918	Succeeded by Philip Shanahan

Dáil	Election	Deputy (Party)	Deputy (Party)	Deputy (Party)	Deputy (Party)
2nd	1921	Seán McGarry (SF)	Seán T. O'Kelly (SF)	Philip Shanahan (SF)	Kathleen Clarke (SF)
3rd	1922	Seán McGarry (PT-SF)	Seán T. O'Kelly (AT-SF)	Alfie Byrne (Ind.)	Laurence O'Neill (Ind.)
4th	1923	Constituency abolished. See Dublin North			

Dáil	Election	Deputy (Party)	Deputy (Party)	Deputy (Party)	Deputy (Party)	Deputy (Party)	Deputy (Party)	Deputy (Party)	Deputy (Party)
4th	1923	Alfie Byrne (Ind.)	Francis Cahill (CnaG)	Margaret Collins-O'Driscoll (CnaG)	Seán McGarry (CnaG)	William Hewat (BP)	Richard Mulcahy (CnaG)	Seán T. O'Kelly (Rep)	Ernie O'Malley (Rep)
4th	1925 by-election	Alfie Byrne (Ind.)	Patrick Leonard (CnaG)	Margaret Collins-O'Driscoll (CnaG)	Oscar Traynor (Rep)	William Hewat (BP)	Richard Mulcahy (CnaG)	Seán T. O'Kelly (Rep)	Ernie O'Malley (Rep)
5th	1927 (Jun)	Alfie Byrne (Ind.)	John Byrne (CnaG)	Margaret Collins-O'Driscoll (CnaG)	Oscar Traynor (SF)	Denis Cullen (Lab)	Richard Mulcahy (CnaG)	Seán T. O'Kelly (FF)	Kathleen Clarke (FF)
6th	1927 (Sep)	Alfie Byrne (Ind.)	John Byrne (CnaG)	Margaret Collins-O'Driscoll (CnaG)	Patrick Leonard (CnaG)	James Larkin (IWL)	Richard Mulcahy (CnaG)	Seán T. O'Kelly (FF)	Eamonn Cooney (FF)
6th	1928 by-election	Alfie Byrne (Ind.)	John Byrne (CnaG)	Margaret Collins-O'Driscoll (CnaG)	Patrick Leonard (CnaG)	Vincent Rice (CnaG)	Richard Mulcahy (CnaG)	Seán T. O'Kelly (FF)	Eamonn Cooney (FF)
6th	1929 by-election	Thomas F. O'Higgins (CnaG)	John Byrne (CnaG)	Margaret Collins-O'Driscoll (CnaG)	Patrick Leonard (CnaG)	Vincent Rice (CnaG)	Richard Mulcahy (CnaG)	Seán T. O'Kelly (FF)	Eamonn Cooney (FF)
7th	1932	Alfie Byrne (Ind.)	John Byrne (CnaG)	Margaret Collins-O'Driscoll (CnaG)	Oscar Traynor (FF)	Cormac Breathnach (FF)	Richard Mulcahy (CnaG)	Seán T. O'Kelly (FF)	Eamonn Cooney (FF)
8th	1933	Alfie Byrne (Ind.)	Patrick Belton (CnaG)	Vincent Rice (CnaG)	Oscar Traynor (FF)	Cormac Breathnach (FF)	Richard Mulcahy (CnaG)	Seán T. O'Kelly (FF)	Eamonn Cooney (FF)
9th	1937	Constituency abolished. See Dublin North-East and Dublin North-West							

Dáil	Election	Deputy (Party)	Deputy (Party)	Deputy (Party)	Deputy (Party)
22nd	1981	Ray Burke (FF)	John Boland (FG)	Nora Owen (FG)	3 seats 1981–1992
23rd	1982 (Feb)	Ray Burke (FF)	John Boland (FG)	Nora Owen (FG)	3 seats 1981–1992
24th	1982 (Nov)	Ray Burke (FF)	John Boland (FG)	Nora Owen (FG)	3 seats 1981–1992
25th	1987	Ray Burke (FF)	John Boland (FG)	G. V. Wright (FF)	3 seats 1981–1992
26th	1989	Ray Burke (FF)	Nora Owen (FG)	Seán Ryan (Lab)	3 seats 1981–1992
27th	1992	Ray Burke (FF)	Nora Owen (FG)	Seán Ryan (Lab)	Trevor Sargent (GP)
28th	1997	Ray Burke (FF)	Nora Owen (FG)	G. V. Wright (FF)	Trevor Sargent (GP)
28th	1998 by-election	Seán Ryan (Lab)	Nora Owen (FG)	G. V. Wright (FF)	Trevor Sargent (GP)
29th	2002	Seán Ryan (Lab)	Jim Glennon (FF)	G. V. Wright (FF)	Trevor Sargent (GP)
30th	2007	James Reilly (FG)	Michael Kennedy (FF)	Darragh O'Brien (FF)	Trevor Sargent (GP)
31st	2011	James Reilly (FG)	Alan Farrell (FG)	Brendan Ryan (Lab)	Clare Daly (SP)
32nd	2016	Constituency abolished. See Dublin Fingal			

Dáil	Election	Deputy (Party)	Deputy (Party)	Deputy (Party)	Deputy (Party)	Deputy (Party)
9th	1937	Alfie Byrne (Ind.)	Oscar Traynor (FF)	James Larkin (Ind.)	3 seats 1937–1948	
10th	1938	Alfie Byrne (Ind.)	Oscar Traynor (FF)	Richard Mulcahy (FG)	3 seats 1937–1948	
11th	1943	Alfie Byrne (Ind.)	Oscar Traynor (FF)	James Larkin (Lab)	3 seats 1937–1948	
12th	1944	Alfie Byrne (Ind.)	Oscar Traynor (FF)	Harry Colley (FF)	3 seats 1937–1948	
13th	1948	Alfie Byrne (Ind.)	Oscar Traynor (FF)	Harry Colley (FF)	Jack Belton (FG)	Peadar Cowan (CnaP)
14th	1951	Alfie Byrne (Ind.)	Oscar Traynor (FF)	Harry Colley (FF)	Jack Belton (FG)	Peadar Cowan (Ind.)
15th	1954	Alfie Byrne (Ind.)	Oscar Traynor (FF)	Harry Colley (FF)	Jack Belton (FG)	Denis Larkin (Lab)
15th	1956 by-election	Patrick Byrne (FG)	Oscar Traynor (FF)	Harry Colley (FF)	Jack Belton (FG)	Denis Larkin (Lab)
16th	1957	Patrick Byrne (FG)	Oscar Traynor (FF)	Charles Haughey (FF)	Jack Belton (FG)	Denis Larkin (Lab)
17th	1961	Patrick Byrne (FG)	George Colley (FF)	Charles Haughey (FF)	Jack Belton (FG)	Eugene Timmons (FF)
17th	1963 by-election	Patrick Byrne (FG)	George Colley (FF)	Charles Haughey (FF)	Paddy Belton (FG)	Eugene Timmons (FF)
18th	1965	Patrick Byrne (FG)	George Colley (FF)	Charles Haughey (FF)	Paddy Belton (FG)	Denis Larkin (Lab)
19th	1969	Conor Cruise O'Brien (Lab)	Eugene Timmons (FF)	Charles Haughey (FF)	Paddy Belton (FG)	4 seats 1969–1977
20th	1973	Conor Cruise O'Brien (Lab)	Eugene Timmons (FF)	Charles Haughey (FF)	Paddy Belton (FG)	4 seats 1969–1977
21st	1977	Constituency abolished				

Dáil	Election	Deputy (Party)	Deputy (Party)	Deputy (Party)	Deputy (Party)
22nd	1981	Michael Woods (FF)	Liam Fitzgerald (FF)	Seán Dublin Bay Rockall Loftus (Ind.)	Michael Joe Cosgrave (FG)
23rd	1982 (Feb)	Michael Woods (FF)	Maurice Manning (FG)	Ned Brennan (FF)	Michael Joe Cosgrave (FG)
24th	1982 (Nov)	Michael Woods (FF)	Maurice Manning (FG)	Liam Fitzgerald (FF)	Michael Joe Cosgrave (FG)
25th	1987	Michael Woods (FF)	Pat McCartan (WP)	Liam Fitzgerald (FF)	Michael Joe Cosgrave (FG)
26th	1989	Michael Woods (FF)	Pat McCartan (WP)	Liam Fitzgerald (FF)	Michael Joe Cosgrave (FG)
27th	1992	Michael Woods (FF)	Tommy Broughan (Lab)	Liam Fitzgerald (FF)	Seán Kenny (Lab)
28th	1997	Michael Woods (FF)	Tommy Broughan (Lab)	Martin Brady (FF)	Michael Joe Cosgrave (FG)
29th	2002	Michael Woods (FF)	Tommy Broughan (Lab)	Martin Brady (FF)	3 seats from 2002
30th	2007	Michael Woods (FF)	Tommy Broughan (Lab)	Terence Flanagan (FG)	3 seats from 2002
31st	2011	Seán Kenny (Lab)	Tommy Broughan (Lab)	Terence Flanagan (FG)	3 seats from 2002
32nd	2016	Constituency abolished. See Dublin Bay North			
