= Dockrell =

Dockrell is a surname. Notable people with the surname include:

- Hazel Dockrell (born 1952), Irish-born microbiologist and immunologist
- Henry Morgan Dockrell (1880–1955), Irish Cumann na nGaedhael and Fine Gael party politician
- Marguerite Dockrell (1912–1983), Irish swimmer
- Maurice Dockrell (Unionist politician) (1850–1929), Irish businessman and politician from Dublin
- Maurice E. Dockrell (1908–1986), Irish Fine Gael party politician
- Percy Dockrell (1914–1979), Irish Fine Gael party politician
- George Dockrell, Irish cricketer
