= Henry Dockrell =

Henry Dockrell may refer to:

- Henry Morgan Dockrell (1880–1955), Irish Cumann na nGaedhael and Fine Gael politician who was elected to both Dáil Éireann and Seanad Éireann
- Percy Dockrell, full name Henry Percy Dockrell, son of the above, (1914–1979), Irish Fine Gael party politician, TD for Dún Laoghaire 1951–1977
