= Maurice Dockrell =

Maurice Dockrell may refer to:

- Maurice Dockrell (Unionist politician) (1850–1929), Irish businessman and Unionist MP for Rathmines
- Maurice E. Dockrell (1908–1986), grandson of the above and Irish Fine Gael party politician
