= Neville Keery =

Irish politician and administrative officer (born 1939)

Senator
- In office 5 November 1969 – 1 June 1973
- Constituency: Nominated by the Taoiseach

Personal details
- Born: 5 May 1939 (age 87) Dublin, Ireland
- Party: Fianna Fáil
- Spouses: Anne Moran (m. 1967; died 2012); Pauline Hall (m. 2019)
- Children: 2
- Education: Trinity College Dublin

Neville Keery (born 5 May 1939) is a writer and activist and has had a career as a journalist, administrative officer, senator, and European Commission official.

== Early and personal life ==
Keery was born in Dublin, Ireland, and educated at St Andrew's College, Dublin, and in 1957 he entered Trinity College Dublin to take a four-year honours degree in philosophy (Mental and Moral Science). He also took a two-year evening course leading to a diploma in public administration. Academically, he was a prizewinner and scholar. He also wrote for the newspaper Trinity News, and became the leading university debater, awarded the gold and silver medals of the College Historical Society. He was the only Irish finalist in the Observer Mace debating competition for British and Irish Universities in 1960. On graduation in 1961 he became an editorial trainee in the north of England with Westminster Press Provincial Newspapers Limited.

In 1967 he married Anne Moran (d. 2012) and they had two children. He married for a second time in 2019. His wife is the poet and novelist Pauline Hall.

== Career ==
In 1964 Keery returned to Dublin as an Administrative Officer in the Institute of Public Administration. He became an active member of Fianna Fáil, then led by Taoiseach Seán Lemass, and of the Irish Film Society. In 1965 he moved to Trinity College Dublin (TCD) to become Assistant Careers and Appointments officer. In 1967 he was promoted to Assistant Secretary of TCD, was conferred with the university's MA degree, and ran unsuccessfully as a Fianna Fáil local election candidate.

Living in the Dún Laoghaire and Rathdown constituency, in 1968 he was elected constituency delegate to the Fianna Fáil National Executive. He was appointed a member of the National Savings Committee.

He stood unsuccessfully at the 1969 general election as a Fianna Fáil candidate. Following the election he was nominated to Seanad Éireann by the Taoiseach Jack Lynch in August 1969. He became a full-time Senator and took leave of absence from TCD.

During his Seanad term, Keery made a notable contribution to international and European affairs. He was a member of the executive committee of the Irish Council of the European Movement, a council member of the Institute of Public Administration, a committee member of the Irish United Nations Association, and a participant in a United Nations Regional Seminar (France) and Wilton Park Conferences (UK). He served as a Trustee of the Irish Family Planning Association and of the Anti-Apartheid Movement in Ireland.

In 1972 Keery was appointed to Fianna Fáil headquarters as Research Officer and Secretary to the Into Europe, Article 44 and Votes at 18 referendum campaigns. He unsuccessfully contested the 1973 general election, he was acting director of the Irish Council of the European Movement before his recruitment to the European Commission as Principal Administrator and deputy head and Press Officer of the commission's Dublin Office. In 1974 he was seconded as Deputy Chef de Cabinet in the office of Patrick Hillery, vice-president of the European Commission, and moved with his family to Brussels. In 1976 Neville and Anne Keery joined the Belgium Monthly Meeting of the Quakers.

In 1977 Keery returned to his Dublin Commission post. He became an Extern Examiner for the degree programme in European Studies of the National Institute for Higher Education, Limerick until 1981.

Following an invitation to join the European Commission's spokesperson's group, Keery moved on a permanent basis to Brussels in 1982. He had become a founder member of the Quaker Council for European Affairs in 1978 and went on a short-term secondment as a cabinet member in the Office of Commissioner Richard Burke. Following completion of a post-graduate course in economics, he was conferred with the degree MSc (Econ.) at TCD in 1981.

While in Brussels from 1982 to his retirement in 2001, Keery had two professional promotions, moving from the spokesperson's service to the Directorate-General for Education and Culture, where his final promotion was to head of Division (Libraries) in 1993. Throughout this period he was involved in a wide range of administrative projects, including the creation of the spokesperson's database, RAPID, the production of a film about the spokesperson's service, the organisation of an Assises Europennes de la Presse (Luxembourg 1991), and the development of EUROLIB, the group of EU institution libraries.

Keery's papers are archived in the Boole Library of University College Cork.

== Other interests ==
His short film on the Irish painter Pat Harris was shown at the UNESCO International Festival of Art Films in 1990 and he was conferred with an MA degree in Film Studies by University College Dublin in 2004. Three collections of poetry have been published by Hinds Publishing, Turnings (1999), Home (2008), and Memoir (2017).
