= Extern minister =

Minor minister of the Irish Free State

In the Irish Free State, an extern minister, formally a Minister who shall not be a Member of the Executive Council, was a minister who had charge of a department but was not a member of the Executive Council. Extern ministers were individually nominated by Dáil Éireann (the lower house), whereas of the Executive Council only the President was: he in turn nominated the other members. All ministers were formally appointed by the Governor-General. The Executive Council included the senior ministers, exercised cabinet collective responsibility, and had to be TDs (members of the Dáil); the extern ministers filled more junior technocratic roles, and need not be legislators, though in fact all were TDs. In practice, all ministers formed a united administration, and no extern ministers were appointed after 1927.

== Origins ==
James G. Douglas, chair of the constitution drafting committee, proposed extern ministers on the model of the Swiss Federal Council. Leo Kohn suggested a precursor was the "Directors" created outside the 1919 Dáil Cabinet by the First Dáil, but Nicholas Mansergh disagreed and Brian Farrell felt the 1919 model was UK junior ministers (parliamentary secretaries). The idea of extern ministers was first mooted as a way of placating republicans opposed to the 1921 Anglo-Irish Treaty on which the Free State was founded. It would have allowed republicans to hold ministries in a national unity government without their having to take the Oath of Allegiance which the Treaty required of members the Oireachtas (parliament). The draft constitution provided for an Executive Council of twelve, of whom four, including the President and Vice President, must be members of the Dáil; of the other eight, at most three might be members of the Dáil or Seanad (upper house). However, British government objections meant the proposal was altered, and extern ministers were required to take the Oath and, though nominated by the Dáil, were appointed by the Governor General. These monarchist changes were unacceptable to republicans.

Nevertheless, as introduced, it still was hoped that extern ministers might be independent non-party figures, possibly non-politicians, who were not even members of the Oireachtas. The 3rd Dáil as a constituent assembly passed a resolution on 6 October 1922 which stated in part:

That this House approves as a general principle, of the proposal that certain Ministers who shall not be members of the Executive Council, nominated by the Dáil, and individually responsible to the Dáil alone for the departments respectively under their charge, need not be members of the Dáil

A committee was formed to draft corresponding articles for the Constitution, and subsequently another committee nominated ministers for relevant departments.

== Constitutional provisions ==
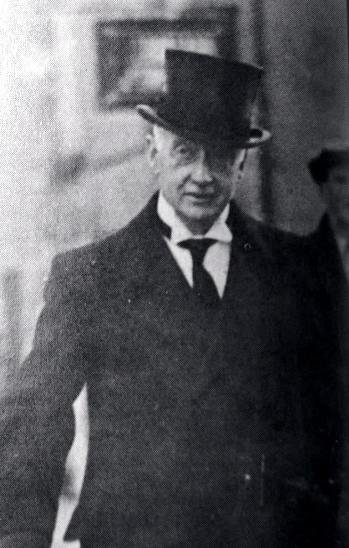
W.T. Cosgrave His government abandoned using extern ministers in 1927.

The relevant provisions were articles 55 and 56 of the Constitution:

Article 55.
Ministers who shall not be members of the Executive Council may be appointed by the Representative of the Crown [Governor General], and shall comply with the provisions of Article 17 of this Constitution [i.e. take the oath of allegiance]. Every such Minister shall be nominated by Dáil Eireann on the recommendation of a Committee of Dáil Eireann chosen by a method to be determined by Dáil Eireann, so as to be impartially representative of Dáil Eireann. Should a recommendation not be acceptable to Dáil Eireann, the Committee may continue to recommend names until one is found acceptable. The total number of Ministers, including the Ministers of the Executive Council, shall not exceed twelve.
Article 56.
Every Minister who is not a member of the Executive Council shall be the responsible head of the Department or Departments under his charge, and shall be individually responsible to Dáil Eireann alone for the administration of the Department or Departments of which he is the head: Provided that should arrangements for Functional or Vocational Councils be made by the Oireachtas these Ministers or any of them may, should the Oireachtas so decide, be members of, and be recommended to Dáil Eireann by, such Councils. The term of office of any Minister, not a member of the Executive Council, shall be the term of Dáil Eireann existing at the time of his appointment, but he shall continue in office until his successor shall have been appointed, and no such Minister shall be removed from office during his term otherwise than by Dáil Eireann itself, and then for stated reasons, and after the proposal to remove him has been submitted to a Committee, chosen by a method to be determined by Dáil Eireann, so as to be impartially representative of Dáil Eireann, and the committee has reported thereon.

== Implementation and abandonment ==
The portfolios to which extern ministers were appointed were Minister for Posts and Telegraphs, Minister for Lands and Agriculture, Minister for Fisheries, and Minister for Local Government and Public Health. Although extern ministers were appointed from 1922 until 1927, in reality they formed a single Cumann na nGaedheal government with the Executive Council, rather than being independent of it. No extern minister was chosen from outside the Dáil; nor from the opposition (Labour, Farmers' Party, or independents) despite the requirement to be "impartially representative of Dáil Eireann". The corporatist vocational councils mentioned in Article 56 were never created. The Ministers and Secretaries Act 1924 required that the parliamentary secretary of an extern minister be a member of the Dáil, whereas Executive Council ministers' parliamentary secretary were permitted to be from either house of the Oireachtas. In fact, only Dáil deputies were ever appointed.

The Annual Report of the Department of Agriculture and Technical Instruction for the year 1921 (delayed by the Civil War) was submitted by the Minister for Agriculture, Patrick J. Hogan, on 22 February 1923 to the Executive Council for transmission to the Governor General. Labour leader Thomas Johnson objected that, as an extern minister, Hogan should have submitted the report to the Dáil rather than the Executive Council; Hogan agreed that it had been a mistake.

The Constitution (Amendment No. 5) Act 1927 increased the maximum size of the Executive Council from seven to twelve. Thereafter, since twelve was the maximum total number of Ministers, there was no point in a TD being an extern minister rather than a member of the Executive Council. The amendment was enacted just before the June 1927 general election, and the subsequent Executive Council included the portfolios previously assigned to extern ministers. Although there was still the possibility of a senator or non-legislator being appointed extern minister, senators objected that Amendment No. 5 made a senator minister less likely. The Constitution (Amendment No. 15) Act, 1929 allowed a senator to be a member of the Executive Council.

The 1937 Constitution requires ministers to be members of the Oireachtas. The Constitutional Convention in 2013 recommended allowing non-legislators to become ministers; Enda Kenny rejected this, on the basis that someone nominated to the Senate by the Taoiseach could become a minister. This has happened twice: Seán Moylan in 1957 and James Dooge in 1981–1982.

== Sources ==
- Cahillane, Laura (2016). Drafting the Irish Free State Constitution. Oxford University Press. ISBN 9781526114372.
- Coakley, John (December 2010). "Selecting Irish government ministers : an alternative pathway?". Administration. 58 (3). Ireland: Institute of Public Administration: 1–26. hdl:10197/2762.
- Malone, Andrew E. (September 1929). "Party Government in the Irish Free State". Political Science Quarterly. 44 (3). The Academy of Political Science: 363–378. doi:10.2307/2142840. JSTOR 2142840.
- Mansergh, Nicholas (2007) [1934]. The Irish Free State - Its Government and Politics. Read. pp. 156–171 and passim. ISBN 978-1406720358.
