= Leydon =

Leydon is a surname. Notable people with the surname include:

- Joe Leydon (born 1952), American film critic and historian
- John Leydon (1895–1979), Irish civil servant
- Mona Leydon (1915–2002), New Zealand swimmer
- Seamus Leydon (born 1942), Gaelic footballer
- Felicity Leydon-Davis (born 1994), New Zealand cricketer
- Oliver Leydon-Davis (born 1990), New Zealand badminton player
- Susannah Leydon-Davis (born 1992), New Zealand badminton player
