= Flor O'Mahony =

Irish politician (1946–2023)

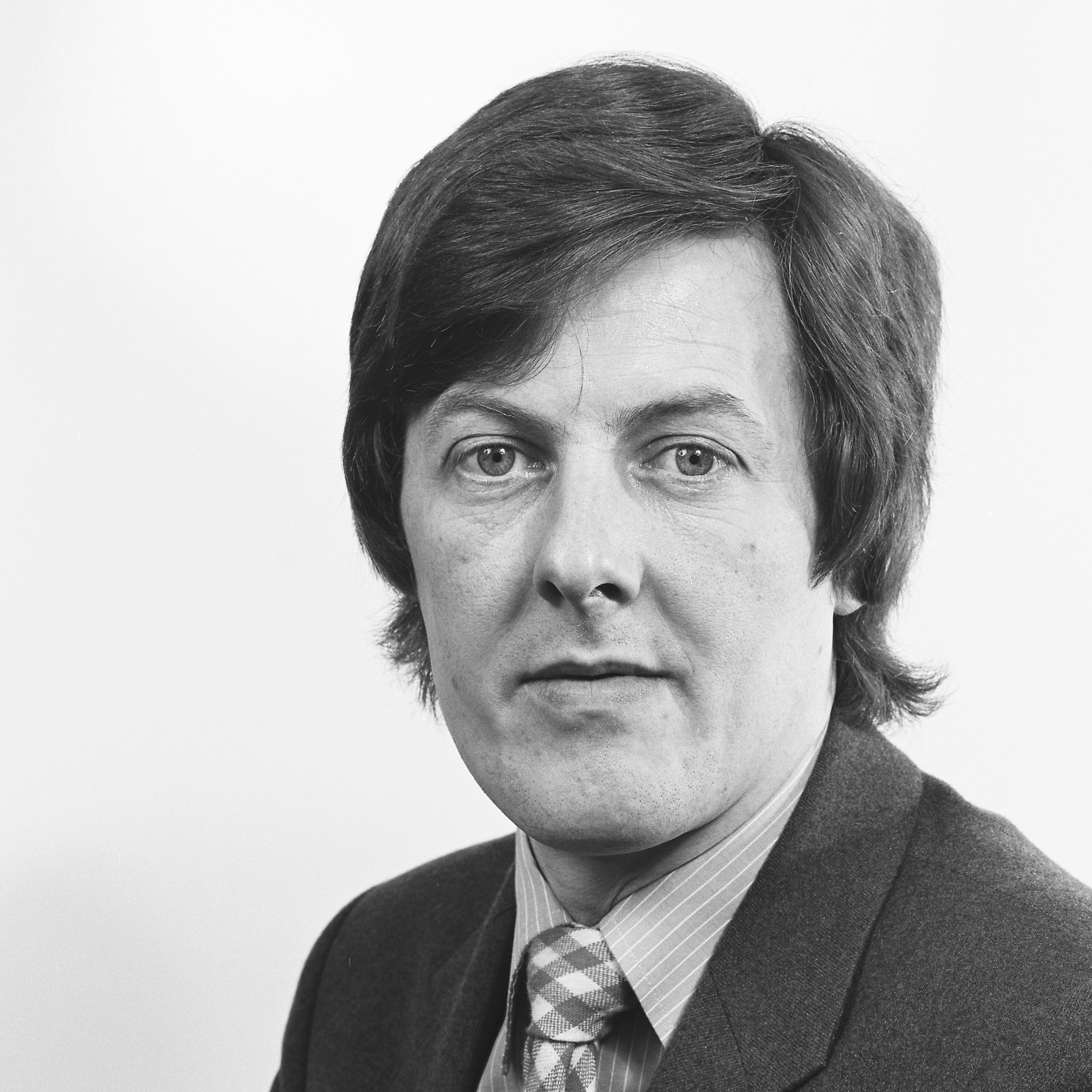
- O'Mahony in 1983

Senator
- In office 8 October 1981 – 25 April 1987
- Constituency: Administrative Panel

Member of the European Parliament
- In office 2 March 1983 – 24 June 1984
- Constituency: Dublin

Personal details
- Born: Florence O'Mahony; 23 January 1946 Dalkey, Dublin, Ireland
- Died: 28 July 2023 (aged 77) Dublin, Ireland
- Party: Labour Party
- Spouse: Judy O'Mahony
- Children: 4
- Education: University College Dublin

Florence O'Mahony (23 January 1946 – 28 July 2023) was an Irish politician. A member of the Labour Party, he was a senator in the 1980s, and was also a Member of the European Parliament (MEP).

O'Mahony later came to prominence as a lobbyist and publicist for the tobacco industry.

== Early life ==
O'Mahony was born in Dalkey, Dublin on 23 January 1946. His father was from Ballyhea in County Kerry. He attended Presentation College in Glasthule and University College Dublin (UCD), graduating with a degree in English literature and economics. He joined the Labour Party during his time in UCD.

== Political career ==
In 1967, while still in college in UCD, O'Mahony was elected to Dún Laoghaire Corporation at the age of 21.

From 1973 to 1977, O'Mahony was a policy advisor to the Tánaiste and Minister for Health, Labour Party leader Brendan Corish. When Labour returned to opposition after the 1977 general election he continued as an advisor to Corish's successor, Frank Cluskey.

O'Mahony himself stood unsuccessfully as a Labour candidate at the 1969 and 1973 general elections in the Dún Laoghaire and Rathdown constituency. He stood in Dublin North-Central at the November 1982 and 1987 general elections, and in Dún Laoghaire at the 1989 general election, but never won a seat in Dáil Éireann.

However, in 1981 he was elected on the Administrative Panel to the 15th Seanad, and was re-elected twice, serving until the dissolution of the 17th Seanad in 1987. In March 1983 he was appointed as a Member of the European Parliament, filling the vacancy caused by the resignation of John Horgan. However, he did not contest the 1984 European election, in which Labour lost the seats in the European Parliament which it had won in the 1979 election.

== Lobbyist ==
After leaving politics, O'Mahony became a public affairs consultant in 1989. He was also an Associate Lecturer in European Studies at the Institute of Public Administration in Dublin.

O'Mahony later became known as the "public face" of the Irish Tobacco Manufacturers Advisory Committee (ITMAC), of which he was director and which shared an office in Dublin with O'Mahony's company CIPA; in 1992 O'Mahony's name was recorded as the donor of IR£3,000 donated to the Progressive Democrats on behalf of ITMAC. As a lobbyist against plans for legislation to protect workers against passive smoking, O'Mahony was named in 1999 as having been involved in lobbying by ITMAC which Dr Fenton Howell, vice-president of the Irish Medical Organisation, claimed "secretly manipulated and misled a group advising the minister for health on new smoking regulations". O'Mahony subsequently told the Joint Oireachtas Committee on Health and Children that he could not remember who gave him information about a meeting of a Department of Health working group which had allowed him to circulate a report of the meeting to tobacco companies within 24 hours of the meeting. After hearing O'Mahony's evidence, the chairman Batt O'Keeffe told Mahony that some of the points made about his conduct were "well-founded", and recommended that "in future deliberations he would be conscious of the public interest and people's health". Howell told a sub-committee in 2001 that O'Mahony had been "less than candid in his replies" to the committee.

O'Mahony was one of three former senior officials of the Irish Labour Party reported to have had ties with the tobacco industry.

== Personal life and death ==
O'Mahony met his wife Judy during his final year at UCD. The couple had four children.

O'Mahony died in Dublin on 28 July 2023, at the age of 77.
