= Aileen O'Brien =

American journalist(

Aileen von Vittinghof gennant Schell zu Schellenburg (née O'Brien; January 4, 1913 – October 30, 2000), was an American writer, journalist, and political activist. She was a Catholic and anti-communist. She is known for her 1938 lecture tour of the United States, where she advocated on behalf of the Nationalist faction of the Spanish Civil War.

== Life and activism ==
Aileen O’Brien was born on 4 January 1913 in San Francisco to William and Margaret O’Brien. Shortly after her family relocated to Bolivia. She spent much of her childhood in Bolivia and Chile. In 1927 she was sent to Switzerland to continue her education. She graduated from the University of Freiburg. While in Switzerland, she helped to launch the quarterly journal The Colosseum. She also became secretary of Pro Deo, “a shadowy Christian, anti-communist organisation based in Geneva”.

In 1934 O’Brien moved to Ireland with her family. She continued her involvement with Pro Deo, as the organizing secretary in Ireland and England. In 1936 she became a founding member of the Irish Christian Front (ICF). The organisation was founded with the intention of showing support and raising funds for the Nationalist faction of the Spanish Civil War. However, it quickly became a political organisation opposed to the Irish government of the day. She was the organizing secretary of the ICF and later its representative in Spain. O'Brien said of the communist threat to Ireland that "communism stood for the abolition of nationality, aiming at making Ireland, not an independent country, but merely a section of the Communist International, with headquarters in Moscow. It was a well-known Communist trick to find out what the people of a country wanted and to promise them that."

In Spain, O’Brien was the intermediary between the ICF and Cardinal Goma over the distribution of funds raised. She helped to organise medical and other relief units for the rebels. She was involved in the Auxilio Social, which acted as a social assistance organization for widows, orphans and the destitute by providing them with food and clothing. She was also closely attached to the Irish Brigade, a group of about 700 Irishmen led by Eoin O'Duffy who fought for the Nationalists.

In early 1938, after 17 months in Spain, O’Brien travelled to the United States to give a lecture tour on behalf of the Spanish nationalists. In addition to the lecture series she addressed many prominent individuals including many Congressmen. Her lectures often attracted large crowds as well as opposition. In Oakland protestors clashed with police outside one of her lectures. This clash resulted in injuries and arrests, in what at least one newspaper characterised as a riot. Her speeches emphasised that General Franco and the rebels were not fascists but were liberal democrats. She stressed the Nationalists’ achievements in areas such as workers’ rights, gender equality, education and housing. She said that they were fighting for Christianity and against communism and anarchism. She contrasted atrocities committed by the Republicans with the Nationalists’ supposed observation of the rules of war.

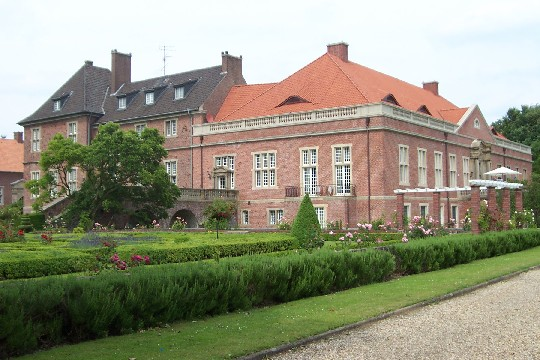
Castle Kalbeck, where Aileen O'Brien lived after her marriage

Nationalist memoirist Luis Bolín recounted that while in the United States, O’Brien spoke on the telephone to every Catholic bishop in the country and begged them to request that their parish priests ask all members of their congregations to telegraph in protest to President Roosevelt. As a result, Bolín claimed, more than a million telegrams were received by the White House and a shipment of arms to the Republicans was stopped.

After the war O’Brien continued to live in Spain and perform services for the Spanish government. In 1940 she wrote The Besieged of the Alcazar about a devout Catholic soldier fighting in the Siege of the Alcázar. She is credited as a writer in 1943 comedy film Castillo de naipes. In 1950 she married politician and baron Felix von Vittinghoff-Schell in Madrid. The couple later relocated to Castle Kalbeck in Weeze in Germany, the baron's ancestral home. O’Brien died in Germany in 2000, aged 87.
