= Joseph Brennan (Clann na Poblachta politician) =

Irish politician (1889–1968)

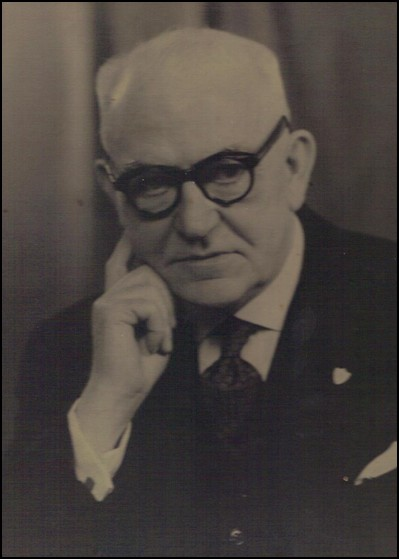

Teachta Dála
- In office February 1948 – May 1951
- Constituency: Dún Laoghaire and Rathdown

Personal details
- Born: 10 September 1889 Fitchburg, Massachusetts
- Died: 4 May 1968 (aged 78) Dublin, Ireland
- Party: Clann na Poblachta
- Other political affiliations: Labour Party
- Spouse: Anne Elizabeth Bulloch (m. 1914)
- Education: Blackrock College; Rockwell College

Joseph Patrick Brennan (10 September 1889 – 4 May 1968) was an Irish Clann na Poblachta politician and medical doctor.

He was born in 1889 in Fitchburg, Massachusetts, U.S. He was the son of Patrick Brennan and Julia O'Connor who married in Boston in 1888. He moved back from the US to his mother's native Knocknagoshel, County Kerry at around the age of six years. His father had received communication from his brothers in Kalgoorlie, Western Australia regarding the Gold Rush and decided to join them in Australia and made his fortune with his brothers in the drapery business. The Brennan Building still stands today in Hannan Street, Kalgoorlie. On his father's return to Ireland in either 1908 or 1912 he brought an estate called Delbrook Park in Dublin.

He was educated at Blackrock College and Rockwell College. He qualified as a doctor in 1917. He married Anne Elizabeth Bulloch in Edinburgh, Scotland in 1914. He entered the British Army in 1917 as a Medical officer serving in Egypt and Turkey.

He returned to Ireland around 1918 and became a General practitioner in Blackrock, County Dublin. He also became Coroner for South County Dublin. Brennan was also involved in the Republican movement sometime in 1918. He was Head of Medical Services during the Irish Civil War. During the civil war, a group of insurgents that included Brennan had occupied part of the Gresham Hotel in O'Connell Street and were holding out against the Free State army. Their position became untenable and the group decided to surrender. The surrender was underway but Cathal Brugha refused to surrender himself came out brandishing a revolver and was shot by the Free State troops. Brennan attended his wounds but Brugha died two days later.

He was Vice President of the Irish Christian Front which held its inaugural meeting at the Mansion House, Dublin on 22 August 1936. The Irish Independent invited the formation of a committee to make a decision to support pro-Franco citizens of Spain in their war effort. Support was also given by the Catholic Church.

Brennan was a founding member of Clann na Poblachta. He was first elected to Dáil Éireann at the 1948 general election as a Clann na Poblachta Teachta Dála (TD) for the Dún Laoghaire and Rathdown constituency. He stood as a Labour Party candidate at the 1951 general election but was not re-elected. He also stood unsuccessfully as a Labour Party candidate at the 1954 general election.

He presided over the International Congress of Catholic Doctors which took place at University College Dublin in 1954. He was president of the Irish Bridge Union in 1955. He was elected as the first president of the Medico Legal Society of Ireland in 1956.

He is buried at Deans Grange Cemetery in Dublin.

Dáil	Election	Deputy (Party)	Deputy (Party)	Deputy (Party)	Deputy (Party)
13th	1948	Seán Brady (FF)	Joseph Brennan (CnaP)	Liam Cosgrave (FG)	3 seats until 1961
14th	1951	Seán Brady (FF)	Percy Dockrell (FG)	Liam Cosgrave (FG)	3 seats until 1961
15th	1954	Seán Brady (FF)	Percy Dockrell (FG)	Liam Cosgrave (FG)	3 seats until 1961
16th	1957	Seán Brady (FF)	Lionel Booth (FF)	Liam Cosgrave (FG)	3 seats until 1961
17th	1961	Seán Brady (FF)	Lionel Booth (FF)	Liam Cosgrave (FG)	Percy Dockrell (FG)
18th	1965	David Andrews (FF)	Lionel Booth (FF)	Liam Cosgrave (FG)	Percy Dockrell (FG)
19th	1969	David Andrews (FF)	Barry Desmond (Lab)	Liam Cosgrave (FG)	Percy Dockrell (FG)
20th	1973	David Andrews (FF)	Barry Desmond (Lab)	Liam Cosgrave (FG)	Percy Dockrell (FG)
21st	1977	Constituency abolished. See Dún Laoghaire			
