= Margaret Dockrell =

Irish suffragist, philanthropist, and councillor (1849–1926)

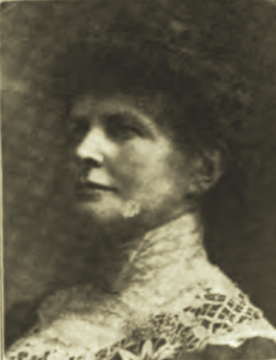
- Born: Margaret Shannon; 18 March 1849; 18 Charlotte Street, Dublin, Ireland
- Died: 29 June 1926 (aged 77); Eaton Square, Monkstown, Dublin
- Occupation: Councillor

Margaret Sarah Dockrell (née Shannon; 18 March 1849 – 29 June 1926) was an Irish suffragist, philanthropist, and councillor.

== Early life and family ==
Margaret Shannon was born on 18 March 1849, at 18 Charlotte Street, Dublin. She was the eldest child of solicitor George William Shannon and Emily Shannon (née Goodman). She had two sisters and two brothers. She attended Alexandra College, and later lectures for women at Trinity College Dublin. She married Maurice Dockrell in July 1875. The couple had seven children, one daughter and six sons. She went on to become a director and member of the board of her husband's family company: Messrs Thomas Dockrell & Sons & Co. Ltd.

== Political career ==
Dockrell was an active member of the committee of the Dublin Women's Suffrage and Local Government Association, later known as the Irish Women's Suffrage and Local Government Association (IWSLGA), founded in 1876 to promote women's suffrage by democratic methods. She attended international women's suffrage conferences in Stockholm in 1911 and Budapest in 1913. She was also a committee member of the London Women's Suffrage Society, speaking on the role of women in local government at the International Congress of Women in London in 1899. The Irish Citizen listed her as a suitable woman candidate to run for the senate seat proposed by the Home rule bill in 1912.

Dockell was a member of the National Union of Women Workers, sitting as a member of its public services committee. Like many of her contemporaries, she believed that women were best placed to address issues around health, societal moral well-being, and housing. From 1898, the Local Government (Ireland) Act, allowed women to be candidates for local government elections. Dockrell first ran as a candidate in the Urban District Council (UDC) of the Monkstown ward of Blackrock, County Dublin in the 1898 local elections, where she was returned as the 3rd of 9 elected, becoming one of only 4 women councillors elected in Ireland.

Dockrell described herself as a unionist and a Protestant, sitting as a council on the Blackrock UDC until her death. She was the only woman councillor on that UDC until 1925 and the election of Ellen O'Neill. Dockrell was also the first woman chair of a UDC when she was elected to the position in 1906.

== Marriage and family ==
Margaret married Maurice Dockrell on 27 July 1875 in Dublin Ireland. They had 7 children.

- Thomas Edward Dockrell (2 Jan 1878 – 16 Jan 1915)
- Henry Morgan Dockrell (17 Apr 1880 – 26 Oct 1955)
- Maurice Dockrell (abt 1883)
- James Dockrell (abt 1884 – 30 Aug 1888)
- George Dockrell (22 Oct 1886 – 23 Dec 1924)
- Kenneth Brooks Dockrell (9 Jan 1888 – 11 Mar 1937)
- Anna Dorothy Dockrell (Abt. 1890 – 24 Jan 1976)

== Later life ==
Despite the political and societal turmoil of the early 20th century in Ireland and the establishment of the Irish Free State, Dockrell continued in her commitment to local politics. This included being the first woman to be elected to a Dublin county council in 1920. Despite remaining a committed unionist, Dockrell worked with the Free State government. Following her husband's knighthood, she was also known as Lady Dockrell. Dockrell died on 29 June 1926, at her home "Camolin", Eaton Square, Monkstown. She is buried in Deans Grange Cemetery. Her son, Henry Morgan Dockrell was also a politician, and another son George was an Olympic swimmer, who competed at the 1908 Summer Olympics. Her granddaughter Marguerite Dockrell, Henry's daughter, also represented Ireland as a swimmer at the Amsterdam Olympics in 1928.
