= Lionel Booth (politician) =

Irish politician (1914–1997)

Teachta Dála
- In office March 1957 – June 1969
- Constituency: Dún Laoghaire and Rathdown

Personal details
- Born: 12 June 1914 Dublin, Ireland
- Died: 31 May 1997 (aged 82) Dublin, Ireland
- Party: Fianna Fáil
- Spouse: Muriel Booth
- Children: 3
- Education: Trinity College Dublin

Lionel O. Booth (12 June 1914 – 31 May 1997) was an Irish Fianna Fáil politician and businessman. He was a Teachta Dála (TD) for twelve years, from 1957 to 1969.

He was educated at Wesley College, Dublin, The Leys School, Cambridge, and Trinity College Dublin. He qualified as a solicitor in 1938 and served as a captain in the Army during the Emergency.

He first entered politics in the 1950s serving on both Dublin County Council and Dún Laoghaire Corporation. He stood unsuccessfully at the 1954 general election, and was first elected to Dáil Éireann at the 1957 general election for Dún Laoghaire and Rathdown. He was re-elected at each subsequent general election, until he retired from politics at the 1969 general election.

Booth is probably best be remembered as an astute businessman. He was both the joint managing director of Booth Poole & Co Ltd from 1956 and managing director of the Brittain Group from 1970.

Dáil	Election	Deputy (Party)	Deputy (Party)	Deputy (Party)	Deputy (Party)
13th	1948	Seán Brady (FF)	Joseph Brennan (CnaP)	Liam Cosgrave (FG)	3 seats until 1961
14th	1951	Seán Brady (FF)	Percy Dockrell (FG)	Liam Cosgrave (FG)	3 seats until 1961
15th	1954	Seán Brady (FF)	Percy Dockrell (FG)	Liam Cosgrave (FG)	3 seats until 1961
16th	1957	Seán Brady (FF)	Lionel Booth (FF)	Liam Cosgrave (FG)	3 seats until 1961
17th	1961	Seán Brady (FF)	Lionel Booth (FF)	Liam Cosgrave (FG)	Percy Dockrell (FG)
18th	1965	David Andrews (FF)	Lionel Booth (FF)	Liam Cosgrave (FG)	Percy Dockrell (FG)
19th	1969	David Andrews (FF)	Barry Desmond (Lab)	Liam Cosgrave (FG)	Percy Dockrell (FG)
20th	1973	David Andrews (FF)	Barry Desmond (Lab)	Liam Cosgrave (FG)	Percy Dockrell (FG)
21st	1977	Constituency abolished. See Dún Laoghaire			
