= Dún Laoghaire and Rathdown =

Dáil constituency (1948–1977)

- Former Dáil constituency

Former constituency
- Created: 1948
- Abolished: 1977
- Seats: 3 (1948–1961); 4 (1961–1977)
- Local government area: County Dublin
- Created from: Dublin County
- Replaced by: Dún Laoghaire

Dún Laoghaire and Rathdown was a parliamentary constituency represented in Dáil Éireann, the lower house of the Irish parliament or Oireachtas from 1948 to 1977. The constituency elected 3 (and later 4) deputies (Teachtaí Dála, commonly known as TDs) to the Dáil, on the system of proportional representation by means of the single transferable vote (PR-STV).

== History and boundaries ==
The constituency was located on the south coast of County Dublin.

Changes to the Dún Laoghaire and Rathdown constituency
Years	TDs	Boundaries	Notes
1948–1961	3	The borough of Dún Laoghaire; and the district electoral divisions of Ballybrack, Dundrum, Glencullen, Milltown, Rathfarnham, Rathmichael, Stillorgan and Whitechurch.	Created from the Dublin County
1961–1969	4	The borough of Dún Laoghaire; and the district electoral divisions of Ballybrack, Rathmichael and Stillorgan; and the townlands of Mountanville, Mountmerrion or Callary, Mountmerrion South, Roebuck and Trimleston or Owenstown in the district electoral division of Dundrum and the townlands of Farranboley, Friarland, Rathmines Great and Rathmines Little in the district electoral division of Milltown, in the former rural district of Rathdown No. 1.	Transfer of the Rathfarnham South ward and the district electoral divisions of Glencullen, Rathfarnham and Whitechurch and the southern parts of the district electoral divisions of Dundrum and Milltown to the constituency of Dublin County; transfer of Rathmichael (Bray) to the constituency of Wicklow following alteration of county boundary.
1969–1977	4	The borough of Dún Laoghaire; the district electoral divisions of Stillorgan; and the townlands of Blackthorn, Brenanstown, Bullock, Carmanhall, Carmanhall and Leopardstown, Carrickmines Little, Kerrymount, Kilbogget, Loughlinstown, Rochestown, Rochestown Domain, Thomastown, in the district electoral division of Ballybrack; Mount Merrion South, in the district electoral division of Dundrum; Shanganagh, in the district electoral division of Rathmichael; in the former rural district of Rathdown No. 1.	Transfer of territory to Dublin County South
1977	—	Constituency abolished	See Dún Laoghaire

== TDs ==
Teachtaí Dála (TDs) for Dún Laoghaire and Rathdown 1948–1969
Key to parties: CnaP = Clann na Poblachta; FF = Fianna Fáil; FG = Fine Gael; Lab = Labour
Dáil	Election	Deputy (Party)	Deputy (Party)	Deputy (Party)	Deputy (Party)
13th	1948	Seán Brady (FF)	Joseph Brennan (CnaP)	Liam Cosgrave (FG)	3 seats until 1961
14th	1951	Seán Brady (FF)	Percy Dockrell (FG)	Liam Cosgrave (FG)	3 seats until 1961
15th	1954	Seán Brady (FF)	Percy Dockrell (FG)	Liam Cosgrave (FG)	3 seats until 1961
16th	1957	Seán Brady (FF)	Lionel Booth (FF)	Liam Cosgrave (FG)	3 seats until 1961
17th	1961	Seán Brady (FF)	Lionel Booth (FF)	Liam Cosgrave (FG)	Percy Dockrell (FG)
18th	1965	David Andrews (FF)	Lionel Booth (FF)	Liam Cosgrave (FG)	Percy Dockrell (FG)
19th	1969	David Andrews (FF)	Barry Desmond (Lab)	Liam Cosgrave (FG)	Percy Dockrell (FG)
20th	1973	David Andrews (FF)	Barry Desmond (Lab)	Liam Cosgrave (FG)	Percy Dockrell (FG)
21st	1977	Constituency abolished. See Dún Laoghaire			

Note: The columns in this table are used only for presentational purposes, and no significance should be attached to the order of columns. For details of the order in which seats were won at each election, see the detailed results of that election.

== Elections ==
*: Outgoing TD

=== 1973 general election ===
1973 general election: Dún Laoghaire and Rathdown
Party	Candidate	FPv%	Count					
Party	Candidate	FPv%	1	2	3	4	5	6
Fine Gael	Liam Cosgrave	31.1	13,054					
Fianna Fáil	David Andrews	26.0	10,926					
Labour	Barry Desmond	13.7	5,768	6,560	6,663	6,921	8,821	
Fianna Fáil	Neville Keery	8.7	3,642	3,686	5,599	6,984	7,090	7,222
Fine Gael	Michael Carroll	6.0	2,537	3,823	3,885	3,958	4,116	
Fine Gael	Percy Dockrell	5.3	2,206	4,584	4,631	4,734	4,932	8,448
Labour	Flor O'Mahony	4.9	2,072	2,187	2,213	2,465		
Fianna Fáil	Eric Leonard	2.9	1,209	1,229	1,596			
Independent	Vincent MacDowell	1.4	591	608	614			
Electorate: 56,151 Valid: 42,005 Quota: 8,402 Turnout: 74.8%

=== 1969 general election ===
1969 general election: Dún Laoghaire and Rathdown
Party	Candidate	FPv%	Count								
Party	Candidate	FPv%	1	2	3	4	5	6	7	8	9
Fine Gael	Liam Cosgrave	28.8	10,825								
Fianna Fáil	David Andrews	27.4	10,292								
Labour	Barry Desmond	7.7	2,870	2,972	3,037	3,118	3,924	4,326	4,406	4,680	7,437
Labour	Flor O'Mahony	6.9	2,570	2,623	2,666	2,712	3,126	3,413	3,468	3,585	
Fine Gael	Percy Dockrell	6.0	2,252	4,282	4,337	4,443	4,524	4,837	4,879	7,516	
Fianna Fáil	Neville Keery	5.7	2,155	2,179	3,161	3,234	3,257	3,454	5,851	5,936	6,166
Fine Gael	Michael Carroll	5.5	2,049	3,005	3,057	3,149	3,216	3,376	3,427		
Independent	Proinsias Mac Aonghusa	3.9	1,446	1,505	1,567	1,665	1,709				
Labour	James Byrne	3.7	1,386	1,421	1,483	1,510					
Fianna Fáil	Carmel Gleeson	2.9	1,097	1,122	2,551	2,642	2,668	2,855			
Independent	James Guinan	1.6	594	627	661						
Electorate: 52,394 Valid: 37,536 Quota: 7,508 Turnout: 71.6%

=== 1965 general election ===
1965 general election: Dún Laoghaire and Rathdown
Party	Candidate	FPv%	Count						
Party	Candidate	FPv%	1	2	3	4	5	6	7
Fine Gael	Liam Cosgrave	25.7	9,696						
Fianna Fáil	David Andrews	21.0	7,932						
Fianna Fáil	Lionel Booth	14.1	5,312	5,357	5,540	5,807	5,853	10,212	
Labour	John Fitzgerald	12.8	4,814	4,936	5,095	5,107	5,303	5,542	6,411
Fianna Fáil	Seán Brady	12.4	4,680	4,714	4,758	4,854	4,899		
Fine Gael	Percy Dockrell	7.4	2,780	4,413	4,680	4,686	6,491	6,618	7,356
Fine Gael	James Guinan	4.8	1,816	2,081	2,155	2,158			
Independent	James Deegan	1.9	707	756					
Electorate: 46,696 Valid: 37,737 Quota: 7,548 Turnout: 80.8%

=== 1961 general election ===
1961 general election: Dún Laoghaire and Rathdown
Party	Candidate	FPv%	Count				
Party	Candidate	FPv%	1	2	3	4	5
Fine Gael	Liam Cosgrave	23.6	7,154				
Fianna Fáil	Seán Brady	16.5	4,994	5,021	6,098		
Fianna Fáil	Lionel Booth	16.0	4,859	4,878	5,413	5,932	6,198
Fine Gael	Percy Dockrell	11.5	3,502	4,198	4,280	4,745	7,456
Fine Gael	John Brennan	9.6	2,926	3,186	3,253	3,551	
Labour	John Fitzgerald	9.6	2,925	2,969	3,061	3,682	3,938
Independent	Seamus Bohan	6.6	2,005	2,035	2,116		
Fianna Fáil	Michael Slattery	6.5	1,968	1,979			
Electorate: 51,080 Valid: 30,333 Quota: 6,067 Turnout: 59.4%

=== 1957 general election ===
1957 general election: Dún Laoghaire and Rathdown
Party	Candidate	FPv%	Count			
Party	Candidate	FPv%	1	2	3	4
Fine Gael	Liam Cosgrave	30.8	11,107			
Fianna Fáil	Lionel Booth	24.6	8,852	8,914	9,343	
Fianna Fáil	Seán Brady	20.7	7,467	7,531	7,740	8,956
Labour	John Fitzgerald	10.9	3,919	4,012	4,613	
Fine Gael	Percy Dockrell	8.1	2,924	4,742	5,181	7,342
Clann na Poblachta	Patrick Begley	4.9	1,780	1,837		
Electorate: 60,016 Valid: 36,049 Quota: 9,013 Turnout: 60.1%

=== 1954 general election ===
1954 general election: Dún Laoghaire and Rathdown
Party	Candidate	FPv%	Count				
Party	Candidate	FPv%	1	2	3	4	5
Fine Gael	Liam Cosgrave	36.4	13,609				
Fianna Fáil	Lionel Booth	15.9	5,941	5,970	6,942	7,401	7,868
Fianna Fáil	Seán Brady	14.8	5,545	5,603	7,319	8,236	8,788
Labour	Joseph Brennan	13.5	5,043	5,338	5,547		
Fine Gael	Percy Dockrell	11.3	4,221	8,020	8,178	11,653	
Fianna Fáil	Matthew Cullen	8.0	3,008	3,094			
Electorate: 56,943 Valid: 37,367 Quota: 9,342 Turnout: 65.6%

=== 1951 general election ===
1951 general election: Dún Laoghaire and Rathdown
Party	Candidate	FPv%	Count				
Party	Candidate	FPv%	1	2	3	4	5
Fine Gael	Liam Cosgrave	30.7	10,043				
Fianna Fáil	Seán Brady	25.3	8,254				
Fine Gael	Percy Dockrell	13.8	4,505	6,145	6,147	6,212	8,807
Labour	Joseph Brennan	12.6	4,107	4,268	4,275	4,425	
Fianna Fáil	Matthew Cullen	11.6	3,800	3,845	3,905	5,654	6,811
Fianna Fáil	Matthew Smith	6.1	1,986	2,009	2,020		
Electorate: 49,403 Valid: 32,695 Quota: 8,174 Turnout: 66.2%

=== 1948 general election ===
1948 general election: Dún Laoghaire and Rathdown
Party	Candidate	FPv%	Count				
Party	Candidate	FPv%	1	2	3	4	5
Fine Gael	Liam Cosgrave	24.2	7,521	7,750	7,849		
Fianna Fáil	Seán Brady	22.0	6,823	6,960	9,610		
Fine Gael	Percy Dockrell	16.6	5,133	5,321	5,373	5,966	6,327
Clann na Poblachta	Joseph Brennan	12.3	3,811	4,204	4,326	4,832	8,112
Clann na Poblachta	Noel Hartnett	10.6	3,281	3,703	3,775	3,968	
Fianna Fáil	Matt Cullen	9.5	2,953	3,044			
Labour	Arnold Marsh	4.8	1,502				
Electorate: 44,212 Valid: 31,024 Quota: 7,757 Turnout: 70.2%

== See also ==
- Politics of the Republic of Ireland
- Historic Dáil constituencies
- Elections in the Republic of Ireland
