= Marguerite Dockrell =

Irish swimmer (1912–1983)

Personal information
- Born: 10 March 1912 Dublin, Ireland
- Died: 9 September 1983 (aged 71) Weymouth, Dorset, England

Sport
- Sport: Swimming

Marguerite Dockrell (10 March 1912 – 9 September 1983) was an Irish swimmer. She competed in the women's 100 metre freestyle event at the 1928 Summer Olympics.

== Early life ==
Marguerite Dockrell was born on 10 March 1912 in Blackrock, County Dublin. Marguerite and the rest of the Dockrell family lived at Danvers House. Which was previously owned by a flower arranger and cookery expert Constance Spry. She mentions the house in her memoirs. She attended Alexandra college like both her mother and grandmother Margaret Dockrell.

== Family life ==
Dockrell was the third child of Henry Morgan Dockrell and Alice Evelyn Dockrell. Her older brother Maurice E. Dockrell and younger brother Percy Dockrell were both Fine Gael politicians. Her father Henry Morgan Dockrell was also a politician. She had a very sporty family with her uncle George Dockrell swimming in the 1908 Olympic Games. Her eldest brother Hayes was part of the water polo team at the 1928 Olympics. Her youngest brother was a well-known orthodontist and he had a bursary named after him.
