= George Dockrell (swimmer) =

Irish swimmer

- Dockrell circa 1900s

Personal information
- Full name: George Shannon Dockrell
- National team: United Kingdom
- Born: 22 October 1886 Rathdown, County Dublin
- Died: 23 December 1924 (aged 38) Richmond, London, England

Sport
- Sport: Swimming
- Strokes: 100 metre freestyle
- Club: Dublin Swimming Club; New York Athletic Club
Men's 100 metre freestyle at the Games of the IV Olympiad
- Venue: White City Stadium
- Dates: July 13, 1908; July 25, 1908
- Winning time: 1:13.2 (heats); 1:11.4 (semifinals); 1st place in Heat 8; 3rd place in Semifinal 2; 5th place overall

George Shannon Dockrell, OBE (22 October 1886 – 23 December 1924) was an Olympic swimmer, best known for competing at the 1908 Summer Olympics in the men's 100 metre freestyle event for Great Britain. He had a lengthy swimming, and military career, until his death in 1924.

== Early and family life ==
He was born William Robert to Maurice Edward Dockrell and Margaret Dockrell on 22 October 1886 in Dublin, Ireland but he was later baptised George Shannon Dockrell. He came from a prominent political family in Dublin. Sir Maurice Edward Dockrell was a Unionist Politician and was one of the few members who took his seat in the British House of Commons after the 1918 general election. His mother, Lady Margaret Dockrell (née Shannon) was a suffragette, who actively campaigned for women's rights, and was a member of Dublin City Council. They were married in 1875 and eventually both his parents worked in the family business of Thomas Dockrell, Sons and Co. Ltd.

Growing up he lived Blackrock, County Dublin with six siblings, a sister named Anna and five brothers Thomas, Kenneth, Maurice, Henry and James. His family was raised Protestant, within the Church of Ireland. His family was also heavily involved in the Dublin Swimming Club, where George won 21 out of the 38 titles won by the Dockrell family. Dockrell spent his school years, from 1899 to 1903 in Trent College, Nottingham where he excelled at swimming. He received his education at Trinity College Dublin.

Several of Dockrell's siblings went to work alongside their parents at Thomas Dockrell, Sons and Co. Ltd. While his brother Henry became a Fine Gael T.D. Meanwhile, Dockrell became more actively involved in his own swimming career. His niece, Marguerite Dockrell, and nephew, Hayes Dockrell, also went on to compete in the 1928 Summer Olympics in Amsterdam. Like Dockrell, his niece competed in swimming, while his nephew took part in the water polo section.

== Swimming career ==
In 1904 he sailed from Liverpool to New York aboard the ship Celtic under the name Geo. S Dockrell. Upon his arrival in New York, he joined the New York Athletic Club, and began to train with American Olympic swimmer, C.M. Daniels. He lived in America for two years and competed in the US 440 and 880 yards championships, coming in third place. When he returned to Ireland in 1906, he had success winning all of the major swimming championships in that same year. At the 1908 Summer Olympics, he was the only member of Great Britain's team that advanced to the semifinals of the men's 100 metre freestyle. He placed first in heat 8 with a winning time of 1:13.2, which earned him an advancement to the semifinals, where he placed third in semifinal 2, with a time of 1:11.4. However, he didn't advance to the finals and ended up being 5th place overall.

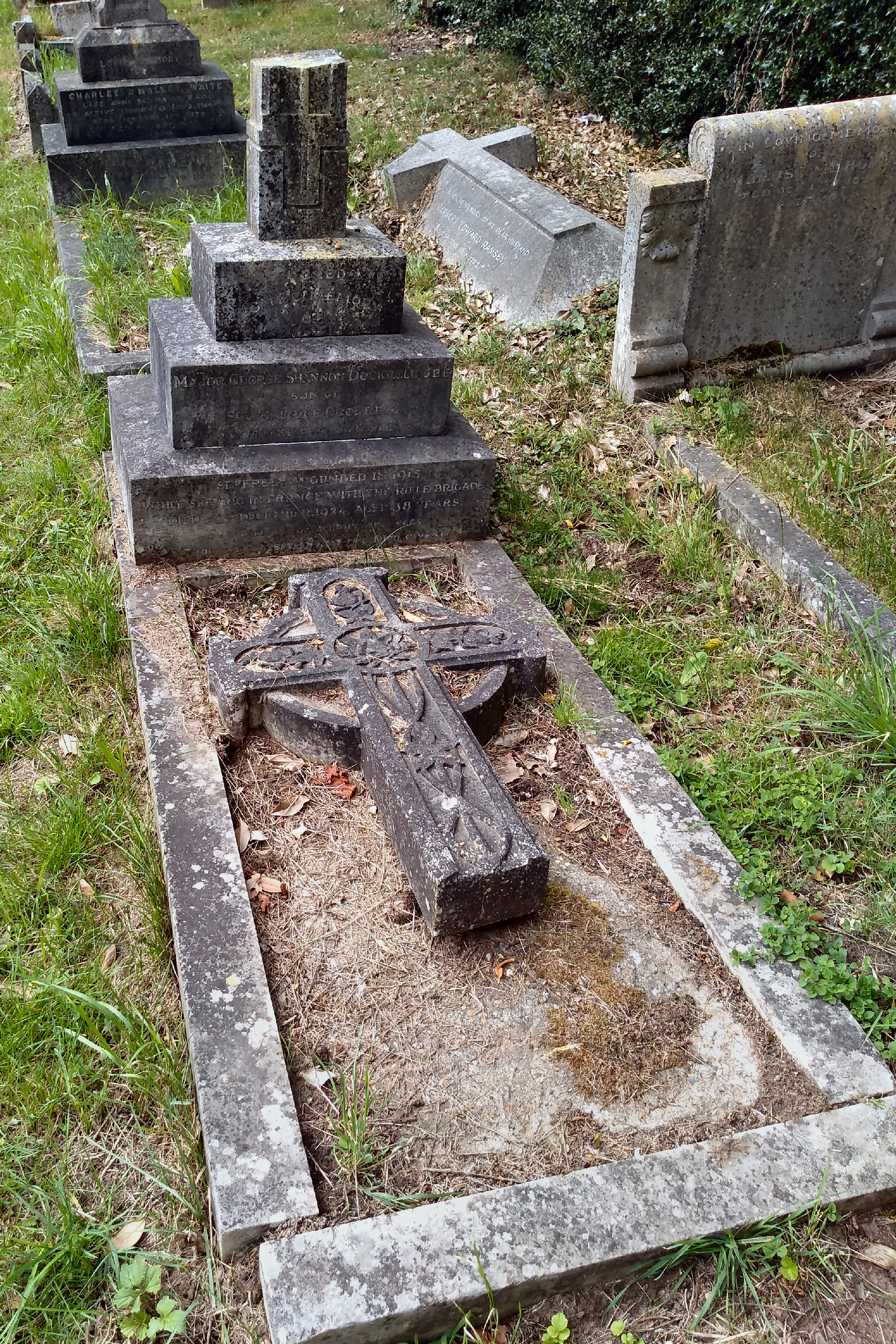
Grave in St Andrew's Church, Ham

== War Service ==
In 1914 he joined the army in the Rifle Brigade, 9th Battalion. He was wounded in France in 1915. He was promoted to Staff Captain in 1917 and to Major in 1919 on completing his service. He was appointed OBE in the 1919 Birthday Honours.

He died from lingering shrapnel wounds to his back on 23 December 1924 at the Officers' Hospital, Richmond, Surrey and was buried at St Andrew's Church, Ham.
