= John Leydon =

Irish civil servant (1895–1979)

- John Leydon in 1979
- Born: 17 January 1895
- Died: August 2, 1979 (aged 84)

John Leydon (17 January 1895 – 2 August 1979) was an Irish civil servant, who served in a number of significant roles in ministerial departments and was involved in the setting up and development of a number of semi-state organisations such as Irish Shipping (first chairman), Aer Rianta (as director and chairman), Aer Lingus (as chairman), and the Institute of Public Administration (first president).

== Early life and education ==
Leydon was born in Arigna, County Roscommon, on 17 January 1895. His parents were farmers, James and Kate Leydon (née Quinn). Leydon had 3 siblings. He was educated at St. Mel's College, Longford, before going to Maynooth College as a seminarian from 1913 to 1914. He did not pursue the priesthood, and instead joined the British civil service in 1915. A devout Catholic, he was a member of the Legion of Mary, whose founder Frank Duff, was a close friend and best man at Leydon's wedding.

== Career ==
Whilst in the British civil service, he worked in the War Office and Ministry of Pensions. He was the private secretary to George Chrystal, the permanent secretary at the Ministry of Pensions from 1919. In this role he met Andy Cope, who became a mentor to him, and ensured Leydon's transfer to the new Irish civil service in 1923.

He entered the Irish civil service as a higher executive officer in the Department of Finance, later promoted to assistant principal officer. In this role he was in charge of the post-truce and civil war compensation claims until 1927 when he was promoted to principal officer. By the end of the 1920s, Leydon had been recognised as one of the most talented and intelligent young men in the civil service, and in 1932 he was offered the position of secretary of the Department of Industry and Commerce by the outgoing Cosgrave administration. He refused, but then took up the renewed offer by the incoming minister for industry and commerce, Seán Lemass. Leydon and Lemass had very different economic beliefs, but Lemass claimed he wanted no "yes-men", and went on to be one of Lemass' key trusted advisors.

With Lemas, he played a role in the creation of Aer Lingus and Bord na Mona, and in the negotiation of the 1938 Anglo-Irish agreements through his contacts in Whitehall. During World War II, Leydon moved to the newly established Department of Supplies with Lemass, serving as secretary from 1939 to 1945. In this capacity he established Irish Shipping in 1941, and a system of wartime rationing. He returned to the Department of Industry and Commerce as secretary in 1945, working there until his retirement on 17 January 1955. He was an unofficial advisor to Lemass until his retirement in 1966. He was involved in the creation of the Irish Management Institute in 1952, and the Institute of Public Administration (IPA) in 1957. He served as president of the IPA from 1957 to 1959.

=== Roles as chairman ===
- Aer Rianta (1936 to 1949)
- Aer Lingus (1937 to 1949)
- Irish Shipping (1941 to 1949)
- Insurance Corporation of Ireland (1955 to 1973)
- Aerlinte Éireann (1958 to 1961)
- Cement Ltd.
- National Bank (director and then chairman)

=== Awards and honours ===
Leydon was awarded by the Vatican the title Knight Commander with star of the Order of St. Gregory the Great in 1948. He was awarded an honorary doctorate from the University of Dublin in 1961.

== Family and death ==
Leydon married Anne 'Nan' Layden in 1927, and they had one daughter, Mary. Leydon died on 2 August 1979, aged 84. He is buried in Dean's Grange Cemetery Dublin.
