= Maurice Dockrell (Unionist politician) =

Irish politician (1850–1929)

Sir Maurice Dockrell
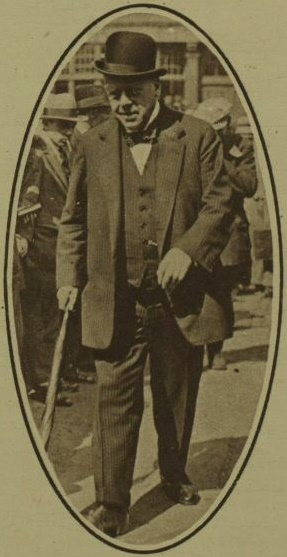
- Dockrell in 1921

Member of Parliament for Dublin Rathmines
- In office 1918–1922
- Preceded by: New constituency
- Succeeded by: Constituency abolished

Personal details
- Born: 21 December 1850 County Dublin, Ireland
- Died: 5 August 1929 (aged 78) County Dublin, Ireland
- Party: Irish Unionist Alliance
- Other political affiliations: Unionist Anti-Partition League
- Spouse: Margaret Shannon (m. 1875–1926)
- Children: 7, including Henry and George
- Relatives: Percy Dockrell (grandson); Maurice E. Dockrell (grandson)
- Education: Trinity College Dublin

Sir Maurice Edward Dockrell (21 December 1850 – 5 August 1929) was an Irish businessman and Unionist politician from Dublin.

== Early life ==
Maurice was the son of Thomas Dockrell and Anne Morgan Brooks, born on 21 December 1850 in Monkstown, Dublin. He was the fifth of ten children. Three of his siblings died in childhood and are buried with his parents in Mount Jerome Cemetery. His father Thomas, was a carpenter and timber merchant at Bishop Street in Dublin. Dockrell was educated at Portora Royal School, Enniskillen, County Fermanagh, where he was a notable swimmer, and at Trinity College Dublin, before entering his father's firm around 1865.

== Politics ==
Dockrell contested the Dublin St Patrick's constituency at the 1885 United Kingdom general election but was decisively defeated by William Martin Murphy. Dockrell was knighted in 1905. He was a member of the Freemason's Grand Lodge of Ireland, reaching the rank of senior grand deacon.

Dockrell was critical of the strikers during the 1913 Dublin lock-out, referring to the strikes as "largely due to feeble government". Dockrell vociferously opposed the Irish Transport and General Workers Union (ITGWU), going so far as to issue revolvers to strike-breakers. He served as chairman of the City of Dublin Recruiting Committee during World War I. During the Easter Rising of 1916 Dockrell's premises on Henry Street and Sir John Rogerson's Quay were looted. In the aftermath he filed claims for financial compensation from the British government. One of his staff, electrical engineer William Breen, fought in the Rising, and when he returned from internment, a deputation of managers and other staff went to Dockrell to say that they would not continue to work in the same firm as Breen. Dockrell's reply was that Breen "fought according to his colour", and "they themselvers were able-bodied men who should be in khaki fighting at the front, and if they did not want to work in the same firm as Breen, they knew their way out".

At the 1918 general election, he was elected as Irish Unionist Alliance Member of Parliament for Dublin Rathmines from 1918 to 1922. Dockrell was the only unionist elected outside of Ulster and the Dublin University constituencies. The nationalist vote had been split between the United Irish League and Sinn Féin. In 1919 he made a speech in Westminster where he declared that he "stands in the House today as the sole representative of 350,000 Unionists of the South of Ireland". The 1918 election was a watershed in Ireland. Following the Easter Rising in 1916, Sinn Féin had grown in popularity, eclipsing the Irish Parliamentary Party. Sinn Féin candidates treated the election as an Irish general election, pledging not to take their seats in the British House of Commons, but to unilaterally establish a separate parliament in Dublin.

At the election, the Dublin University constituency returned two Unionists, and Dockrell was the only other Irish Unionist returned outside Ulster. Rather than joining Sinn Féin in the First Dáil, Dockrell took his seat in the House of Commons of the United Kingdom. On 28 June 1921 Dockrell was one of five Unionist leaders invited by to a meeting to discuss the future government of Ireland by the republican leader, Éamon de Valera.

== Personal life ==
He married Margaret Shannon on 27 July 1875 in Dublin Ireland. They had seven children, including Henry Morgan Dockrell and George Dockrell. Margaret Dockrell was a suffragist, philanthropist, and councillor. His son Henry Morgan Dockrell was later a Fine Gael Teachta Dála (TD), and his grandsons Percy and Maurice Dockrell were also long-serving Fine Gael TDs. He was knighted in 1905. Maurice ran the Dockrell family business of builders' providers in Dublin.

He died on 5 August 1929 in Dublin.

== See also ==
- Families in the Oireachtas

Parliament of the United Kingdom
New constituency	Member of Parliament for Dublin Rathmines; 1918–1922	Constituency abolished
