= Institute of Public Administration (Ireland) =

- Irish: An Foras Riaracháin
- Motto: Building Capability in Ireland's Public Service
- Type: Public
- Established: 1957
- Affiliations: NUI (1982-2011;2018-present); University College Dublin (2011-2018)
- Chairperson: George Burke
- President: Martin O'Halloran
- Vice-president: John Callinan; Ray Dolan; Dr Attracta Halpin
- Director: Helen Brophy
- Location: Dublin, Ireland; 53.3336°N 6.2299°W
- Campus: urban
- Website: http://www.ipa.ie

The Institute of Public Administration (The IPA; Irish: An Foras Riaracháin) is an Irish institute for Public Service education. It is a recognised college of the National University of Ireland and works closely with the Department of Public Expenditure, Infrastructure, Public Service Reform and Digitalisation.

The institute's education, learning and development services are delivered through four key areas: the Whitaker School of Government and Management, Senior Public Service (SPS), OneLearning and Professional Development. The IPA's latest five-year strategy is entitled A New Era of Learning: Strategy 2022–2027. It is currently directed by Helen Brophy.

The institute was founded in 1957 at a meeting in Newman House where Tom Barrington became the first director and John Leydon its first president.
