= Percy Dockrell =

Irish politician (1914–1979)

Teachta Dála
- In office October 1961 – June 1977
- In office May 1951 – March 1957
- Constituency: Dún Laoghaire and Rathdown

Personal details
- Born: Henry Percy Dockrell; 27 December 1914 Dublin, Ireland
- Died: 22 November 1979 (aged 64) Dublin, Ireland
- Party: Fine Gael
- Spouse: Dorothy Wadsworth Brooks (m. 1942)
- Children: 2
- Parent: Henry Morgan Dockrell (father)
- Relatives: Maurice Dockrell (grandfather); Maurice E. Dockrell (brother)

Henry Percy Dockrell (27 December 1914 – 22 November 1979) was an Irish Fine Gael politician who served for twenty years as a Teachta Dála (TD).

Dockrell first stood as a Fine Gael candidate for the Dún Laoghaire and Rathdown constituency at the 1948 general election. He was unsuccessful, but was elected at the 1951 general election, and was re-elected at the 1954 general election. He was defeated at the 1957 general election, but regained his seat at the 1961 general election and was re-elected a further three times for the same constituency. The constituency was divided for the 1977 general election. He stood as a candidate for Dún Laoghaire but was not elected.

His father Henry Morgan Dockrell and his brother Maurice E. Dockrell were also Fine Gael TDs. His grandfather Sir Maurice Dockrell had been a Unionist MP before independence. On 24 September 1942 he married Dorothy Wadsworth Brooks. Percy Dockrell's two sons, John H. Dockrell and William Dockrell, served as councillors on the Corporation of Dún Laoghaire, and in William's case on its successor Dún Laoghaire–Rathdown County Council.

== See also ==
- Families in the Oireachtas

Dáil	Election	Deputy (Party)	Deputy (Party)	Deputy (Party)	Deputy (Party)
13th	1948	Seán Brady (FF)	Joseph Brennan (CnaP)	Liam Cosgrave (FG)	3 seats until 1961
14th	1951	Seán Brady (FF)	Percy Dockrell (FG)	Liam Cosgrave (FG)	3 seats until 1961
15th	1954	Seán Brady (FF)	Percy Dockrell (FG)	Liam Cosgrave (FG)	3 seats until 1961
16th	1957	Seán Brady (FF)	Lionel Booth (FF)	Liam Cosgrave (FG)	3 seats until 1961
17th	1961	Seán Brady (FF)	Lionel Booth (FF)	Liam Cosgrave (FG)	Percy Dockrell (FG)
18th	1965	David Andrews (FF)	Lionel Booth (FF)	Liam Cosgrave (FG)	Percy Dockrell (FG)
19th	1969	David Andrews (FF)	Barry Desmond (Lab)	Liam Cosgrave (FG)	Percy Dockrell (FG)
20th	1973	David Andrews (FF)	Barry Desmond (Lab)	Liam Cosgrave (FG)	Percy Dockrell (FG)
21st	1977	Constituency abolished. See Dún Laoghaire			
