= 12th Dáil =

TDs from 1944 to 1948

←	11th Dáil	13th Dáil	→

Overview
- Legislative body: Dáil Éireann
- Jurisdiction: Ireland
- Meeting place: Leinster House
- Term: 9 June 1944 – 12 January 1948
- Election: 1944 general election
- Government: 4th government of Ireland
- Members: 138
- Ceann Comhairle: Frank Fahy
- Taoiseach: Éamon de Valera
- Tánaiste: Seán Lemass — Seán T. O'Kelly until 14 June 1945
- Chief Whip: Eamon Kissane
- Leader of the Opposition: Richard Mulcahy

Sessions
- 1st: 9 June 1944 – 28 June 1944
- 2nd: 19 September 1944 – 20 July 1945
- 3rd: 10 October 1945 – 21 August 1946
- 4th: 23 October 1946 – 6 August 1947
- 5th: 8 October 1947 – 11 December 1947

The 12th Dáil was elected at the 1944 general election on 30 May 1944 and first met on 9 June 1944. The members of Dáil Éireann, the house of representatives of the Oireachtas (legislature), of Ireland are known as TDs. It sat with the 5th Seanad as the two Houses of the Oireachtas.

The 12th Dáil was dissolved by President Seán T. O'Kelly on 12 January 1948, at the request of the Taoiseach Éamon de Valera. The 12th Dáil lasted 3 years, 217 days.

== Composition of the 12th Dáil ==
- 4th government

Party	May 1944	Jan. 1948	Change
Fianna Fáil	76	76	Steady
Fine Gael	30	25	▼5
Clann na Talmhan	11	11	Steady
Labour	8	8	Steady
National Labour	4	4	Steady
Monetary Reform	1	1	Steady
Clann na Poblachta	—N/a	2	▲2
Independent	8	8	Steady
Ceann Comhairle	—N/a	1	▲1
Vacant	—N/a	2	▲2
Total	138		

=== Graphical representation ===
This is a graphical comparison of party strengths in the 12th Dáil from June 1944. This was not the official seating plan.

== Ceann Comhairle ==
On 9 June 1944, Frank Fahy (FF), who had served as Ceann Comhairle since 1932, was proposed by Éamon de Valera and seconded by Richard Mulcahy for the position, and was elected without a vote.

== TDs by constituency ==
The 138 TDs elected at the 1944 general election are listed by Dáil constituency.

Members of the 12th Dáil
Constituency	Name	Party
Athlone–Longford	Thomas Carter	Fianna Fáil
Athlone–Longford	Erskine H. Childers	Fianna Fáil
Athlone–Longford	Seán Mac Eoin	Fine Gael
Carlow–Kildare	Thomas Harris	Fianna Fáil
Carlow–Kildare	James Hughes	Fine Gael
Carlow–Kildare	Francis Humphreys	Fianna Fáil
Carlow–Kildare	William Norton	Labour
Cavan	Patrick O'Reilly	Clann na Talmhan
Cavan	Tom O'Reilly	Independent
Cavan	Michael Sheridan	Fianna Fáil
Cavan	Paddy Smith	Fianna Fáil
Clare	Patrick Burke	Fine Gael
Clare	Thomas Burke	Independent
Clare	Éamon de Valera	Fianna Fáil
Clare	Seán O'Grady	Fianna Fáil
Clare	Peter O'Loghlen	Fianna Fáil
Cork Borough	Richard Anthony	Independent
Cork Borough	Frank Daly	Fianna Fáil
Cork Borough	William Dwyer	Independent
Cork Borough	Walter Furlong	Fianna Fáil
Cork North	Patrick Halliden	Clann na Talmhan
Cork North	Patrick McAuliffe	Labour
Cork North	Seán Moylan	Fianna Fáil
Cork North	Leo Skinner	Fianna Fáil
Cork South-East	William Broderick	Fine Gael
Cork South-East	Martin Corry	Fianna Fáil
Cork South-East	Seán McCarthy	Fianna Fáil
Cork West	Seán Buckley	Fianna Fáil
Cork West	Timothy J. Murphy	Labour
Cork West	Patrick O'Driscoll	Clann na Talmhan
Cork West	Eamonn O'Neill	Fine Gael
Cork West	Timothy O'Sullivan	Fianna Fáil
Donegal East	Neal Blaney	Fianna Fáil
Donegal East	John Friel	Fianna Fáil
Donegal East	Daniel McMenamin	Fine Gael
Donegal East	William Sheldon	Independent
Donegal West	Brian Brady	Fianna Fáil
Donegal West	Cormac Breslin	Fianna Fáil
Donegal West	Michael Óg McFadden	Fine Gael
Dublin South	Robert Briscoe	Fianna Fáil
Dublin South	Maurice E. Dockrell	Fine Gael
Dublin South	Peadar Doyle	Fine Gael
Dublin South	James Larkin Jnr	Labour
Dublin South	Seán Lemass	Fianna Fáil
Dublin South	James Lynch	Fianna Fáil
Dublin South	John McCann	Fianna Fáil
Dublin County	Seán Brady	Fianna Fáil
Dublin County	Patrick Burke	Fianna Fáil
Dublin County	Liam Cosgrave	Fine Gael
Dublin County	Henry Dockrell	Fine Gael
Dublin County	Patrick Fogarty	Fianna Fáil
Dublin North-East	Alfie Byrne	Independent
Dublin North-East	Harry Colley	Fianna Fáil
Dublin North-East	Oscar Traynor	Fianna Fáil
Dublin North-West	Cormac Breathnach	Fianna Fáil
Dublin North-West	Patrick McGilligan	Fine Gael
Dublin North-West	John S. O'Connor	Fianna Fáil
Dublin North-West	Seán T. O'Kelly	Fianna Fáil
Dublin North-West	Martin O'Sullivan	Labour
Dublin Townships	Bernard Butler	Fianna Fáil
Dublin Townships	John A. Costello	Fine Gael
Dublin Townships	Seán MacEntee	Fianna Fáil
Galway East	Patrick Beegan	Fianna Fáil
Galway East	Frank Fahy	Fianna Fáil
Galway East	Michael Donnellan	Clann na Talmhan
Galway East	Mark Killilea Snr	Fianna Fáil
Galway West	Gerald Bartley	Fianna Fáil
Galway West	Michael Lydon	Fianna Fáil
Galway West	Joseph Mongan	Fine Gael
Kerry North	Patrick Finucane	Clann na Talmhan
Kerry North	Eamon Kissane	Fianna Fáil
Kerry North	Tom McEllistrim	Fianna Fáil
Kerry North	Dan Spring	National Labour Party
Kerry South	Frederick Crowley	Fianna Fáil
Kerry South	John Healy	Fianna Fáil
Kerry South	Fionán Lynch	Fine Gael
Kilkenny	Eamonn Coogan	Fine Gael
Kilkenny	Thomas Derrig	Fianna Fáil
Kilkenny	James Pattison	National Labour Party
Leitrim	Stephen Flynn	Fianna Fáil
Leitrim	Bernard Maguire	Independent
Leitrim	Mary Reynolds	Fine Gael
Leix–Offaly	Patrick Boland	Fianna Fáil
Leix–Offaly	William Davin	Labour
Leix–Offaly	Patrick Gorry	Fianna Fáil
Leix–Offaly	Thomas F. O'Higgins	Fine Gael
Leix–Offaly	Oliver J. Flanagan	Monetary Reform
Limerick	George C. Bennett	Fine Gael
Limerick	Daniel Bourke	Fianna Fáil
Limerick	Michael Colbert	Fianna Fáil
Limerick	Michael Keyes	Labour
Limerick	Donnchadh Ó Briain	Fianna Fáil
Limerick	James Reidy	Fine Gael
Limerick	Robert Ryan	Fianna Fáil
Louth	Frank Aiken	Fianna Fáil
Louth	James Coburn	Fine Gael
Louth	Laurence Walsh	Fianna Fáil
Mayo North	Patrick Browne	Fine Gael
Mayo North	James Kilroy	Fianna Fáil
Mayo North	P. J. Ruttledge	Fianna Fáil
Mayo South	Joseph Blowick	Clann na Talmhan
Mayo South	Dominick Cafferky	Clann na Talmhan
Mayo South	Micheál Clery	Fianna Fáil
Mayo South	Mícheál Ó Móráin	Fianna Fáil
Mayo South	Richard Walsh	Fianna Fáil
Meath–Westmeath	Charles Fagan	Fine Gael
Meath–Westmeath	Patrick Giles	Fine Gael
Meath–Westmeath	Michael Hilliard	Fianna Fáil
Meath–Westmeath	Michael Kennedy	Fianna Fáil
Meath–Westmeath	Matthew O'Reilly	Fianna Fáil
Monaghan	James Dillon	Independent
Monaghan	Bridget Rice	Fianna Fáil
Monaghan	Conn Ward	Fianna Fáil
Roscommon	John Beirne	Clann na Talmhan
Roscommon	Gerald Boland	Fianna Fáil
Roscommon	Daniel O'Rourke	Fianna Fáil
Sligo	Martin Brennan	Fianna Fáil
Sligo	Martin Roddy	Fine Gael
Sligo	Patrick Rogers	Fine Gael
Tipperary	Dan Breen	Fianna Fáil
Tipperary	Andrew Fogarty	Fianna Fáil
Tipperary	Frank Loughman	Fianna Fáil
Tipperary	Daniel Morrissey	Fine Gael
Tipperary	Richard Mulcahy	Fine Gael
Tipperary	William O'Donnell	Clann na Talmhan
Tipperary	Mary Ryan	Fianna Fáil
Waterford	Denis Heskin	Clann na Talmhan
Waterford	Patrick Little	Fianna Fáil
Waterford	Michael Morrissey	Fianna Fáil
Waterford	Bridget Redmond	Fine Gael
Wexford	Denis Allen	Fianna Fáil
Wexford	Richard Corish	Labour
Wexford	John Keating	Fine Gael
Wexford	John O'Leary	National Labour Party
Wexford	James Ryan	Fianna Fáil
Wicklow	Thomas Brennan	Fianna Fáil
Wicklow	Patrick Cogan	Clann na Talmhan
Wicklow	James Everett	National Labour Party

== Changes ==
Date	Constituency	Loss	Gain	Note
9 June 1944	Galway East	Fianna Fáil	Ceann Comhairle	Frank Fahy takes office as Ceann Comhairle
3 October 1944	Kerry South	Fine Gael		Resignation of Fionán Lynch on appointment as a Circuit Court judge
10 November 1944	Kerry South		Fianna Fáil	Donal O'Donoghue gains the seat vacated by Lynch
7 February 1945	Clare	Fine Gael		Death of Patrick Burke
5 May 1945	Kerry South	Fianna Fáil		Death of Frederick Crowley
18 June 1945	Dublin North-West	Fianna Fáil		Election of Seán T. O'Kelly as president of Ireland
19 July 1945	Wexford	Labour		Death of Richard Corish
10 October 1945	Mayo South	Fianna Fáil		Resignation of Micheál Clery to take office as Dublin county registrar
4 December 1945	Clare		Fianna Fáil	Patrick Shanahan gains the seat vacated by the death of Burke
4 December 1945	Kerry South		Fianna Fáil	Honor Crowley holds the seat vacated by the death of her husband Frederick Crowley
4 December 1945	Dublin North-West		Fianna Fáil	Vivion de Valera holds the seat vacated by O'Kelly
4 December 1945	Wexford		Labour	Brendan Corish holds the seat vacated by the death of his father Richard Corish
4 December 1945	Mayo South		Clann na Talmhan	Bernard Commons gains the seat vacated by Clery
29 March 1946	Cork Borough	Independent		Resignation of William Dwyer
14 June 1946	Cork Borough		Fianna Fáil	Patrick McGrath gains the seat vacated by Dwyer
4 February 1947	Tipperary	Clann na Talmhan		Death of William O'Donnell
2 May 1947	Dublin County	Fianna Fáil		Death of Patrick Fogarty
10 May 1947	Waterford	Fianna Fáil		Death of Michael Morrissey
31 July 1947	Meath–Westmeath	Fine Gael	Independent	Charles Fagan resigns from party
29 October 1947	Tipperary		Clann na Poblachta	Patrick Kinane gains the seat vacated by the death of O'Donnell
29 October 1947	Dublin County		Clann na Poblachta	Seán MacBride gains the seat vacated by the death of Fogarty
29 October 1947	Waterford		Fianna Fáil	John Ormonde holds the seat vacated by the death of Morrissey
1 January 1948	Carlow–Kildare	Fine Gael		Death of James Hughes
8 January 1948	Sligo	Fine Gael		Death of Martin Roddy

Eamonn Coogan (FG), an outgoing TD for Kilkenny, died after the dissolution of the 12th Dáil, during the 1948 general election campaign.
