= Dominick Cafferky =

Irish politician (died 1971)

Teachta Dála
- In office May 1951 – May 1954
- In office June 1943 – February 1948
- Constituency: Mayo South

Personal details
- Died: 15 March 1971
- Party: Clann na Talmhan
- Spouse: Hannah Kilkenny

Dominick Cafferky (died 15 March 1971) was an Irish Clann na Talmhan politician. A farmer from Kilkelly, County Mayo, he was first elected to Dáil Éireann as a Clann na Talmhan Teachta Dála (TD) for the Mayo South constituency at the 1943 general election. He was re-elected at the 1944 general election but lost his seat at the 1948 general election. He re-gained his seat at the 1951 general election but again lost his seat at the 1954 general election. He was an unsuccessful candidate at the 1957 and 1961 general elections.

In the early 1940s, Cafferky was imprisoned with Bernard Commons for one month in Sligo Prison for his part in land agitation in Mayo, after which he won a Dáil seat.

== See also ==
- List of members of the Oireachtas imprisoned since 1923

| Dáil | Election | Deputy (Party) | Deputy (Party) | Deputy (Party) | Deputy (Party) | Deputy (Party) |
|---|---|---|---|---|---|---|
| 4th | 1923 | Tom Maguire (Rep) | Michael Kilroy (Rep) | William Sears (CnaG) | Joseph MacBride (CnaG) | Martin Nally (CnaG) |
| 5th | 1927 (Jun) | Thomas J. O'Connell (Lab) | Michael Kilroy (FF) | Eugene Mullen (FF) | James FitzGerald-Kenney (CnaG) | Martin Nally (CnaG) |
| 6th | 1927 (Sep) | Thomas J. O'Connell (Lab) | Michael Kilroy (FF) | Richard Walsh (FF) | James FitzGerald-Kenney (CnaG) | Martin Nally (CnaG) |
| 7th | 1932 | Edward Moane (FF) | Michael Kilroy (FF) | Richard Walsh (FF) | James FitzGerald-Kenney (CnaG) | Martin Nally (CnaG) |
| 8th | 1933 | Edward Moane (FF) | Michael Kilroy (FF) | Richard Walsh (FF) | James FitzGerald-Kenney (CnaG) | Martin Nally (CnaG) |
| 9th | 1937 | Edward Moane (FF) | Micheál Clery (FF) | Richard Walsh (FF) | James FitzGerald-Kenney (FG) | Martin Nally (FG) |
| 10th | 1938 | Mícheál Ó Móráin (FF) | Micheál Clery (FF) | Richard Walsh (FF) | James FitzGerald-Kenney (FG) | Martin Nally (FG) |
| 11th | 1943 | Mícheál Ó Móráin (FF) | Micheál Clery (FF) | Joseph Blowick (CnaT) | James FitzGerald-Kenney (FG) | Dominick Cafferky (CnaT) |
| 12th | 1944 | Mícheál Ó Móráin (FF) | Micheál Clery (FF) | Joseph Blowick (CnaT) | Richard Walsh (FF) | Dominick Cafferky (CnaT) |
| 12th | 1945 by-election | Mícheál Ó Móráin (FF) | Bernard Commons (CnaT) | Joseph Blowick (CnaT) | Richard Walsh (FF) | Dominick Cafferky (CnaT) |
| 13th | 1948 | Mícheál Ó Móráin (FF) | Bernard Commons (CnaT) | Joseph Blowick (CnaT) | Richard Walsh (FF) | 4 seats 1948–1969 |
| 14th | 1951 | Mícheál Ó Móráin (FF) | Seán Flanagan (FF) | Joseph Blowick (CnaT) | Dominick Cafferky (CnaT) | 4 seats 1948–1969 |
| 15th | 1954 | Mícheál Ó Móráin (FF) | Seán Flanagan (FF) | Joseph Blowick (CnaT) | Henry Kenny (FG) | 4 seats 1948–1969 |
| 16th | 1957 | Mícheál Ó Móráin (FF) | Seán Flanagan (FF) | Joseph Blowick (CnaT) | Henry Kenny (FG) | 4 seats 1948–1969 |
| 17th | 1961 | Mícheál Ó Móráin (FF) | Seán Flanagan (FF) | Joseph Blowick (CnaT) | Henry Kenny (FG) | 4 seats 1948–1969 |
| 18th | 1965 | Mícheál Ó Móráin (FF) | Seán Flanagan (FF) | Michael Lyons (FG) | Henry Kenny (FG) | 4 seats 1948–1969 |
| 19th | 1969 | Constituency abolished. See Mayo East and Mayo West | | | | |
