= Mayo South (Dáil constituency) =

Dáil constituency (1923–1969)

- Former Dáil constituency
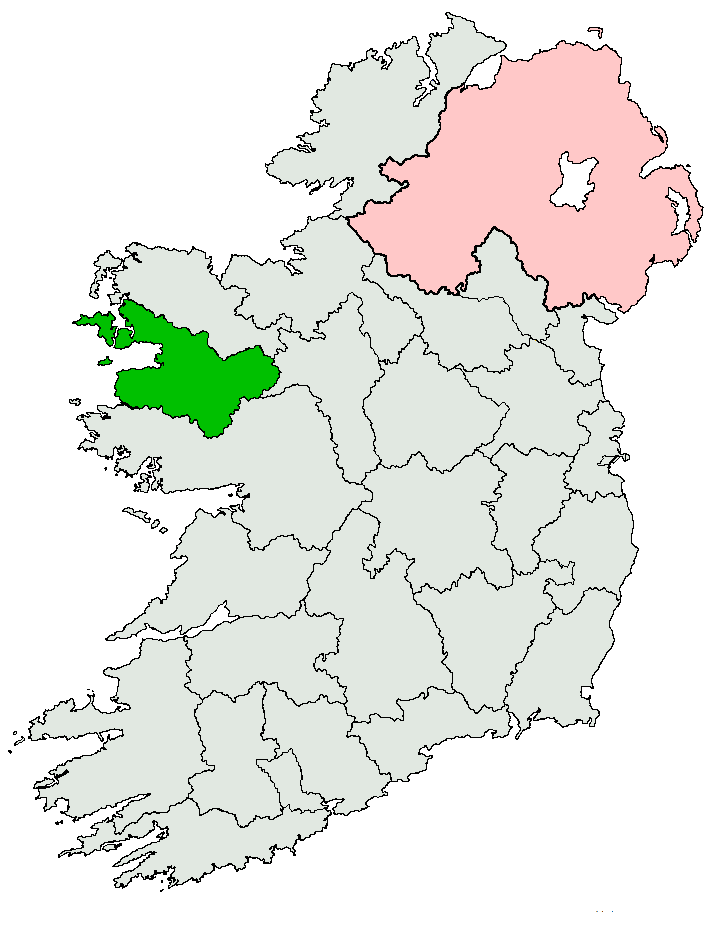
- Location of Mayo South within Ireland

Former constituency
- Created: 1923
- Abolished: 1969
- Seats: 5 (1923–1948); 4 (1948–1969)
- Local government area: County Mayo
- Created from: Mayo North and West; Mayo South–Roscommon South; Sligo–Mayo East
- Replaced by: Mayo East; Mayo West

Mayo South was a parliamentary constituency represented in Dáil Éireann, the lower house of the Irish parliament or Oireachtas from 1923 to 1969. The method of election was proportional representation by means of the single transferable vote (PR-STV).

== History ==
The constituency was created under the Electoral Act 1923 for the 1923 general election to Dáil Éireann, whose members formed the 4th Dáil.

From 1923 to 1948, Mayo South elected 5 deputies (Teachtaí Dála, commonly known as TDs). Under the Electoral (Amendment) Act 1947, this was reduced to 4 with effect from the 1948 general election.

It was abolished under the Electoral (Amendment) Act 1969, when it and Mayo North were replaced by the two new constituencies of Mayo East and Mayo West.

== Boundaries ==
The constituency covered the county electoral areas of Castlebar, Claremorris and Westport, in the administrative county of Mayo.

== TDs ==
Teachtaí Dála (TDs) for Mayo South 1923–1969
Key to parties: CnaG = Cumann na nGaedheal; CnaT = Clann na Talmhan; FF = Fianna Fáil; FG = Fine Gael; Lab = Labour; Rep = Republican
Dáil	Election	Deputy (Party)	Deputy (Party)	Deputy (Party)	Deputy (Party)	Deputy (Party)
4th	1923	Tom Maguire (Rep)	Michael Kilroy (Rep)	William Sears (CnaG)	Joseph MacBride (CnaG)	Martin Nally (CnaG)
5th	1927 (Jun)	Thomas J. O'Connell (Lab)	Michael Kilroy (FF)	Eugene Mullen (FF)	James FitzGerald-Kenney (CnaG)	Martin Nally (CnaG)
6th	1927 (Sep)	Thomas J. O'Connell (Lab)	Michael Kilroy (FF)	Richard Walsh (FF)	James FitzGerald-Kenney (CnaG)	Martin Nally (CnaG)
7th	1932	Edward Moane (FF)	Michael Kilroy (FF)	Richard Walsh (FF)	James FitzGerald-Kenney (CnaG)	Martin Nally (CnaG)
8th	1933	Edward Moane (FF)	Michael Kilroy (FF)	Richard Walsh (FF)	James FitzGerald-Kenney (CnaG)	Martin Nally (CnaG)
9th	1937	Edward Moane (FF)	Micheál Clery (FF)	Richard Walsh (FF)	James FitzGerald-Kenney (FG)	Martin Nally (FG)
10th	1938	Mícheál Ó Móráin (FF)	Micheál Clery (FF)	Richard Walsh (FF)	James FitzGerald-Kenney (FG)	Martin Nally (FG)
11th	1943	Mícheál Ó Móráin (FF)	Micheál Clery (FF)	Joseph Blowick (CnaT)	James FitzGerald-Kenney (FG)	Dominick Cafferky (CnaT)
12th	1944	Mícheál Ó Móráin (FF)	Micheál Clery (FF)	Joseph Blowick (CnaT)	Richard Walsh (FF)	Dominick Cafferky (CnaT)
12th	1945 by-election	Mícheál Ó Móráin (FF)	Bernard Commons (CnaT)	Joseph Blowick (CnaT)	Richard Walsh (FF)	Dominick Cafferky (CnaT)
13th	1948	Mícheál Ó Móráin (FF)	Bernard Commons (CnaT)	Joseph Blowick (CnaT)	Richard Walsh (FF)	4 seats 1948–1969
14th	1951	Mícheál Ó Móráin (FF)	Seán Flanagan (FF)	Joseph Blowick (CnaT)	Dominick Cafferky (CnaT)	4 seats 1948–1969
15th	1954	Mícheál Ó Móráin (FF)	Seán Flanagan (FF)	Joseph Blowick (CnaT)	Henry Kenny (FG)	4 seats 1948–1969
16th	1957	Mícheál Ó Móráin (FF)	Seán Flanagan (FF)	Joseph Blowick (CnaT)	Henry Kenny (FG)	4 seats 1948–1969
17th	1961	Mícheál Ó Móráin (FF)	Seán Flanagan (FF)	Joseph Blowick (CnaT)	Henry Kenny (FG)	4 seats 1948–1969
18th	1965	Mícheál Ó Móráin (FF)	Seán Flanagan (FF)	Michael Lyons (FG)	Henry Kenny (FG)	4 seats 1948–1969
19th	1969	Constituency abolished. See Mayo East and Mayo West				

Note: The columns in this table are used only for presentational purposes, and no significance should be attached to the order of columns. For details of the order in which seats were won at each election, see the detailed results of that election.

== Elections ==
*: Outgoing TD

=== 1965 general election ===
1965 general election: Mayo South
Party	Candidate	FPv%	Count					
Party	Candidate	FPv%	1	2	3	4	5	6
Fianna Fáil	Mícheál Ó Móráin	23.7	7,286					
Fine Gael	Henry Kenny	23.0	7,071					
Fianna Fáil	Seán Flanagan	15.6	4,799	5,510	5,546	6,811		
Fine Gael	Michael Lyons	13.9	4,265	4,295	4,831	5,018	5,111	5,679
Fine Gael	Martin Finn	13.8	4,247	4,291	4,556	4,694	4,772	5,125
Clann na Poblachta	Oliver Morahan	5.4	1,651	1,710	1,778	1,835	1,918	
Fianna Fáil	John J. Keane	4.7	1,442	1,731	1,744			
Electorate: 42,253 Valid: 30,761 Quota: 6,153 Turnout: 72.8%

=== 1961 general election ===
1961 general election: Mayo South
Party	Candidate	FPv%	Count						
Party	Candidate	FPv%	1	2	3	4	5	6	7
Fianna Fáil	Mícheál Ó Móráin	23.1	6,965						
Fine Gael	Henry Kenny	20.6	6,215						
Fianna Fáil	Seán Flanagan	14.5	4,368	4,841	4,849	4,908	6,045		
Clann na Talmhan	Joseph Blowick	13.6	4,088	4,189	4,231	4,566	4,652	5,180	5,748
Fine Gael	Martin Finn	8.0	2,409	2,426	2,476	2,534	2,651	3,016	
Fine Gael	Michael Lyons	7.4	2,230	2,252	2,334	2,415	2,454	3,116	4,904
Independent	Dominick Cafferky	6.4	1,941	1,961	1,968	1,991	2,033		
Fianna Fáil	George McGuire	4.1	1,236	1,530	1,533	1,576			
Clann na Talmhan	Thomas Thornton	2.1	645	663	666				
Electorate: 44,841 Valid: 30,097 Quota: 6,020 Turnout: 67.1%

=== 1957 general election ===
1957 general election: Mayo South
Party	Candidate	FPv%	Count					
Party	Candidate	FPv%	1	2	3	4	5	6
Clann na Talmhan	Joseph Blowick	16.8	5,749	6,056	6,247	6,689	7,078	
Fianna Fáil	Mícheál Ó Móráin	16.5	5,624	5,736	5,778	5,833	7,530	
Fianna Fáil	Seán Flanagan	15.8	5,391	5,475	5,590	5,750	7,038	
Fine Gael	Henry Kenny	12.9	4,411	4,587	5,922	6,265	6,490	6,603
Fianna Fáil	Patrick Duffy	10.6	3,624	3,853	3,868	3,911		
Clann na Talmhan	Dominick Cafferky	9.7	3,311	3,405	4,016	5,445	5,563	5,636
Clann na Talmhan	Douglas Kelly	7.4	2,525	2,541	2,613			
Fine Gael	Michael Lyons	6.9	2,366	2,427				
Clann na Poblachta	Oliver Morahan	3.4	1,155					
Electorate: 49,018 Valid: 34,156 Quota: 6,832 Turnout: 69.7%

=== 1954 general election ===
1954 general election: Mayo South
Party	Candidate	FPv%	Count							
Party	Candidate	FPv%	1	2	3	4	5	6	7	8
Clann na Talmhan	Joseph Blowick	17.3	6,338	6,463	6,602	7,923				
Fianna Fáil	Seán Flanagan	15.7	5,742	5,804	6,538	6,630	6,640	7,661		
Fine Gael	Henry Kenny	13.6	4,983	5,045	5,156	5,438	5,508	5,659	5,686	8,220
Fianna Fáil	Mícheál Ó Móráin	11.5	4,204	4,250	5,164	5,204	5,216	7,139	7,430	
Fine Gael	Michael Lyons	9.3	3,400	3,427	3,492	3,647	3,676	3,723	3,732	
Fianna Fáil	Patrick Duffy	9.0	3,309	3,334	3,453	3,487	3,489			
Clann na Talmhan	Dominick Cafferky	8.7	3,197	3,237	3,258	4,130	4,602	4,775	4,781	5,607
Clann na Talmhan	Bernard Commons	7.3	2,669	2,824	2,882					
Fianna Fáil	Bernard Joyce	6.0	2,190	2,215						
Independent	Martin Carney	1.6	603							
Electorate: 50,516 Valid: 36,635 Quota: 7,328 Turnout: 72.5%

=== 1951 general election ===
1951 general election: Mayo South
Party	Candidate	FPv%	Count								
Party	Candidate	FPv%	1	2	3	4	5	6	7	8	9
Clann na Talmhan	Joseph Blowick	18.1	6,974	7,096	7,180	7,217	8,838				
Clann na Talmhan	Dominick Cafferky	15.5	5,947	5,959	5,972	6,282	7,804				
Fianna Fáil	Mícheál Ó Móráin	13.5	5,187	5,209	5,220	5,506	5,606	5,661	5,667	9,116	
Fianna Fáil	Patrick Gibbons	12.4	4,756	4,771	4,815	4,961	5,029	5,042	5,044		
Fine Gael	John T. Ruane	10.6	4,085	4,383	4,824	4,917	5,271	6,229	6,332	6,587	6,666
Fianna Fáil	Seán Flanagan	10.1	3,887	3,895	3,899	5,481	5,591	5,639	5,644	6,520	7,869
Clann na Talmhan	Bernard Commons	9.8	3,751	3,784	3,791	3,888					
Fianna Fáil	Martin J. Cassidy	7.1	2,713	2,715	2,717						
Fine Gael	Patrick Shanley	1.5	578	613							
Fine Gael	Patrick Gavin	1.5	561								
Electorate: 52,366 Valid: 38,439 Quota: 7,688 Turnout: 73.4%

=== 1948 general election ===
1948 general election: Mayo South
Party	Candidate	FPv%	Count							
Party	Candidate	FPv%	1	2	3	4	5	6	7	8
Clann na Talmhan	Joseph Blowick	13.0	5,052	5,067	5,336	5,358	5,970	6,311	6,332	7,198
Fianna Fáil	Richard Walsh	11.8	4,594	4,621	4,662	7,135	7,269	8,528		
Clann na Talmhan	Bernard Commons	11.3	4,393	4,423	4,486	4,530	5,168	5,330	5,346	8,583
Clann na Talmhan	Dominick Cafferky	10.8	4,193	4,361	4,390	4,511	4,683	4,738	4,744	
Fianna Fáil	Patrick Gibbons	10.0	3,889	3,919	4,170	4,314	4,540			
Fianna Fáil	Mícheál Ó Móráin	9.6	3,713	3,749	3,837	4,375	4,594	6,705	7,382	7,435
Fianna Fáil	Patrick Regan	9.1	3,534	3,646	3,674					
Fine Gael	John T. Ruane	8.7	3,379	4,179	4,287	4,410	4,912	5,068	5,098	5,303
Clann na Poblachta	John James Durcan	5.9	2,307	2,574	3,897	3,933				
Clann na Poblachta	Owen Hughes	5.1	1,967	2,288						
Fine Gael	John McCarthy	2.5	983							
Clann na Poblachta	John Grealy	2.3	883							
Electorate: 55,555 Valid: 38,887 Quota: 7,778 Turnout: 70.0%

=== 1945 by-election ===
Following the resignation of Fianna Fáil TD Micheál Clery, a by-election was held on 4 December 1945. The seat was won by the Clann na Talmhan candidate Bernard Commons.

1945 by-election: Mayo South
Party	Candidate	FPv%	Count
Party	Candidate	FPv%	1
Clann na Talmhan	Bernard Commons	53.3	16,977
Fianna Fáil	Charles Gilmartin	46.7	14,861
Electorate: 57,775 Valid: 31,838 Quota: 15,920 Turnout: 55.1%

=== 1944 general election ===
1944 general election: Mayo South
Party	Candidate	FPv%	Count					
Party	Candidate	FPv%	1	2	3	4	5	6
Fianna Fáil	Micheál Clery	17.4	6,814					
Clann na Talmhan	Dominick Cafferky	14.7	5,743	5,757	6,131	6,177	8,287	
Fianna Fáil	Richard Walsh	13.7	5,366	5,522	5,575	6,413	6,563	
Fianna Fáil	Mícheál Ó Móráin	11.8	4,620	4,646	4,679	6,438	6,493	6,507
Clann na Talmhan	Joseph Blowick	11.4	4,471	4,474	4,501	4,589	5,876	7,580
Clann na Talmhan	Bernard Commons	9.7	3,789	3,797	3,829	3,868		
Fine Gael	James FitzGerald-Kenney	9.5	3,738	3,744	4,914	4,983	5,115	5,153
Fianna Fáil	Michael Kilroy	7.2	2,825	2,888	2,923			
Fine Gael	John O'Connor	4.6	1,819	1,826				
Electorate: 59,780 Valid: 39,185 Quota: 6,531 Turnout: 65.6%

=== 1943 general election ===
1943 general election: Mayo South
Party	Candidate	FPv%	Count										
Party	Candidate	FPv%	1	2	3	4	5	6	7	8	9	10	11
Fianna Fáil	Micheál Clery	14.6	6,118	6,147	6,174	6,201	6,289	6,427	6,495	6,983			
Clann na Talmhan	Dominick Cafferky	12.9	5,415	5,434	5,453	5,502	5,602	6,037	6,100	6,175	6,175	8,400	
Clann na Talmhan	Joseph Blowick	11.9	4,992	4,999	5,058	5,168	5,272	5,328	5,761	5,969	5,970	7,188	
Fianna Fáil	Richard Walsh	10.2	4,283	4,302	4,411	4,487	4,603	4,640	4,823	5,479	5,483	5,593	5,636
Clann na Talmhan	Bernard Commons	8.8	3,695	3,721	3,756	3,786	4,054	4,078	4,135	4,177	4,177		
Fianna Fáil	Mícheál Ó Móráin	8.4	3,516	3,538	3,570	3,723	3,762	3,808	4,440	5,940	5,944	5,983	6,001
Fine Gael	James FitzGerald-Kenney	7.3	3,052	3,062	3,118	3,194	4,137	5,213	5,433	5,633	5,633	5,936	6,054
Fianna Fáil	Michael Gallagher	6.9	2,892	2,907	2,918	2,956	2,967	2,986	3,629				
Independent	John Morahan	5.5	2,307	2,311	2,326	2,550	2,572	2,624					
Fine Gael	William Gallagher	4.6	1,925	1,943	1,947	1,985	2,073						
Fine Gael	Martin Nally	4.3	1,791	1,819	1,861	1,912							
Labour	James Quigley	1.9	790	868	1,174								
Labour	William Walsh (Ballinrobe)	1.6	669	777									
Labour	William Walsh (Kiltimagh)	1.0	398										
Electorate: 59,780 Valid: 41,843 Quota: 6,974 Turnout: 70.0%

=== 1938 general election ===
1938 general election: Mayo South
Party	Candidate	FPv%	Count						
Party	Candidate	FPv%	1	2	3	4	5	6	7
Fianna Fáil	Micheál Clery	20.5	8,781						
Fianna Fáil	Richard Walsh	15.9	6,816	7,469					
Fine Gael	James FitzGerald-Kenney	15.7	6,727	6,762	6,763	6,965	8,288		
Fianna Fáil	Mícheál Ó Móráin	12.6	5,395	5,600	5,697	5,952	6,029	6,072	6,097
Fine Gael	Martin Nally	11.2	4,813	4,841	4,844	4,976	8,148		
Fine Gael	William Gallagher	11.2	4,779	4,812	4,814	4,882			
Fianna Fáil	Edward Moane	10.8	4,617	5,285	5,509	5,660	5,734	5,791	5,823
Labour	James Quigley	2.2	923	940	940				
Electorate: 59,800 Valid: 42,851 Quota: 7,142 Turnout: 71.7%

=== 1937 general election ===
1937 general election: Mayo South
Party	Candidate	FPv%	Count						
Party	Candidate	FPv%	1	2	3	4	5	6	7
Fianna Fáil	Micheál Clery	20.0	8,235						
Fianna Fáil	Richard Walsh	15.5	6,373	6,805	7,179				
Fine Gael	James FitzGerald-Kenney	14.5	5,951	5,983	6,389	6,404	6,637	6,695	7,644
Fine Gael	James Morrisroe	9.7	3,988	3,999	4,073	4,076	4,141	4,169	
Fine Gael	Martin Nally	9.5	3,906	3,925	4,276	4,298	4,363	4,402	6,966
Fine Gael	James McGing	9.3	3,834	3,854	3,996	3,998	4,131	4,203	4,515
Fianna Fáil	Edward Moane	9.0	3,684	4,288	4,538	4,641	7,182		
Fianna Fáil	Mícheál Ó Móráin	7.9	3,246	3,418	3,587	3,698			
Independent	Malachi Forde	4.6	1,907	1,997					
Electorate: 59,999 Valid: 41,124 Quota: 6,855 Turnout: 68.5%

=== 1933 general election ===
1933 general election: Mayo South
Party	Candidate	FPv%	Count				
Party	Candidate	FPv%	1	2	3	4	5
Fianna Fáil	Michael Kilroy	17.2	7,033				
Fianna Fáil	Richard Walsh	15.6	6,410	6,422	6,447	6,566	6,608
Fianna Fáil	George Maguire	14.2	5,805	5,887	5,946	6,010	6,044
Fianna Fáil	Edward Moane	13.9	5,706	5,802	5,851	6,134	6,230
Cumann na nGaedheal	James FitzGerald-Kenney	13.6	5,588	5,589	5,870	8,342	
Cumann na nGaedheal	Martin Nally	12.0	4,926	4,927	5,234	6,841	
Cumann na nGaedheal	James McGing	9.2	3,764	3,768	4,768		
Cumann na nGaedheal	Patrick O'Donnell	4.3	1,773	1,775			
Electorate: 51,619 Valid: 41,005 Quota: 6,835 Turnout: 79.4%

=== 1932 general election ===
1932 general election: Mayo South
Party	Candidate	FPv%	Count							
Party	Candidate	FPv%	1	2	3	4	5	6	7	8
Cumann na nGaedheal	James FitzGerald-Kenney	18.3	7,041							
Fianna Fáil	Richard Walsh	18.0	6,945							
Fianna Fáil	Michael Kilroy	14.5	5,589	5,610	5,739	6,105	7,628			
Fianna Fáil	Edward Moane	12.2	4,711	4,731	4,844	5,007	5,912	7,003		
Cumann na nGaedheal	Martin Nally	8.9	3,414	3,704	3,717	4,073	4,271	4,291	4,308	6,952
Cumann na nGaedheal	Martin Moran	8.0	3,094	3,305	3,314	3,727	3,797	3,828	3,849	
Labour	Thomas J. O'Connell	8.0	3,085	3,105	3,132	3,447	3,719	3,785	4,134	4,666
Fianna Fáil	George Maguire	7.4	2,839	2,850	3,063	3,178				
Independent	Thomas Moclair	4.7	1,796	1,844	1,865					
Electorate: 50,843 Valid: 38,514 Quota: 6,420 Turnout: 75.8%

=== September 1927 general election ===
September 1927 general election: Mayo South
Party	Candidate	FPv%	Count			
Party	Candidate	FPv%	1	2	3	4
Cumann na nGaedheal	James FitzGerald-Kenney	16.5	5,650	5,698	5,701	5,787
Cumann na nGaedheal	Martin Nally	15.3	5,241	5,297	5,300	5,503
Fianna Fáil	Richard Walsh	14.5	4,978	5,987		
Fianna Fáil	Michael Kilroy	12.1	4,171	5,538	5,733	
Cumann na nGaedheal	Patrick O'Donnell	11.8	4,058	4,095	4,097	4,245
Labour	Thomas J. O'Connell	11.0	3,790	3,953	3,963	5,107
Fianna Fáil	Edward Moane	9.7	3,344	3,707	3,758	
Fianna Fáil	Eugene Mullen	9.0	3,104			
Electorate: 52,989 Valid: 34,336 Quota: 5,723 Turnout: 64.8%

=== June 1927 general election ===
June 1927 general election: Mayo South
Party	Candidate	FPv%	Count										
Party	Candidate	FPv%	1	2	3	4	5	6	7	8	9	10	11
Labour	Thomas J. O'Connell	12.1	4,144	4,228	4,325	4,617	4,779	5,296	5,944				
Fianna Fáil	Michael Kilroy	11.2	3,836	3,929	3,977	4,043	4,062	4,221	4,442	4,489	4,491	6,101	
Cumann na nGaedheal	Martin Nally	10.0	3,429	3,587	3,722	3,924	4,763	5,066	5,649	5,726			
Fianna Fáil	Eugene Mullen	9.6	3,282	3,322	3,355	3,406	3,440	3,792	3,884	3,902	3,905	4,393	4,735
Fianna Fáil	Richard Walsh	9.6	3,268	3,313	3,367	3,379	3,412	3,556	3,609	3,618	3,621	4,431	4,496
Fianna Fáil	Edward Moane	8.9	3,056	3,101	3,129	3,255	3,270	3,320	3,367	3,375	3,375		
Cumann na nGaedheal	James FitzGerald-Kenney	8.4	2,884	2,952	3,281	3,596	4,166	4,561	5,546	5,637	5,661	5,713	
Cumann na nGaedheal	Patrick O'Donnell	6.8	2,336	2,344	2,424	2,805	3,015	3,286					
National League	Thomas Moclair	6.6	2,260	2,296	2,517	2,639	2,712						
Cumann na nGaedheal	Joseph MacBride	5.2	1,769	1,828	1,910								
Cumann na nGaedheal	William Sears	5.1	1,728	1,772	1,927	2,114							
Farmers' Party	Peter Tuohy	3.2	1,093	1,417									
Farmers' Party	Thomas Kelly	3.1	1,075										
Electorate: 52,989 Valid: 34,160 Quota: 5,694 Turnout: 64.5%

=== 1923 general election ===
1923 general election: Mayo South
Party	Candidate	FPv%	Count								
Party	Candidate	FPv%	1	2	3	4	5	6	7	8	9
Cumann na nGaedheal	William Sears	20.5	6,571								
Republican	Tom Maguire	17.8	5,712								
Cumann na nGaedheal	Joseph MacBride	14.8	4,758	5,117	5,124	5,417					
Republican	Michael Kilroy	11.0	3,516	3,524	3,637	3,689	3,692	3,812	4,146	6,460	
Cumann na nGaedheal	Martin Nally	10.8	3,468	3,932	3,941	4,140	4,169	4,322	4,650	4,690	4,737
Cumann na nGaedheal	Charles Bewley	7.7	2,479	2,656	2,658	2,784	2,813	3,223	3,590	3,613	3,626
Republican	Thomas Derrig	6.7	2,148	2,152	2,372	2,389	2,390	2,455	2,551		
Labour	Michael O'Connor	4.0	1,298	1,345	1,354	1,411	1,416	1,633			
Independent	P. J. O'Malley	3.7	1,175	1,234	1,236	1,347	1,354				
Farmers' Party	Peter Tuohy	2.9	929	1,039	1,046						
Electorate: 58,513 Valid: 32,054 Quota: 5,343 Turnout: 54.8%

== See also ==
- Dáil constituencies
- Politics of the Republic of Ireland
- Historic Dáil constituencies
- Elections in the Republic of Ireland
