= Micheál Clery =

Irish politician

Teachta Dála
- In office July 1937 – 10 October 1945
- Constituency: Mayo South
- In office September 1927 – July 1937
- Constituency: Mayo North

Personal details
- Born: County Mayo, Ireland
- Party: Fianna Fáil

Micheál Clery or Michael Cleary was an Irish Fianna Fáil politician, solicitor and teacher. He was first elected to Dáil Éireann as a Fianna Fáil Teachta Dála (TD) at the September 1927 general election for the Mayo North constituency. He was re-elected at every subsequent general election up to 1944.

He resigned in October 1945 during the 12th Dáil following his appointment as County Registrar of Dublin. The subsequent by-election was held on 4 December 1945 and was won by Bernard Commons of Clann na Talmhan.

Dáil	Election	Deputy (Party)	Deputy (Party)	Deputy (Party)	Deputy (Party)
4th	1923	P. J. Ruttledge (Rep)	Henry Coyle (CnaG)	John Crowley (Rep)	Joseph McGrath (CnaG)
4th	1924 by-election	P. J. Ruttledge (Rep)	John Madden (Rep)	John Crowley (Rep)	Joseph McGrath (CnaG)
4th	1925 by-election	P. J. Ruttledge (Rep)	John Madden (Rep)	John Crowley (Rep)	Michael Tierney (CnaG)
5th	1927 (Jun)	P. J. Ruttledge (FF)	John Madden (SF)	Michael Davis (CnaG)	Mark Henry (CnaG)
6th	1927 (Sep)	P. J. Ruttledge (FF)	Micheál Clery (FF)	Michael Davis (CnaG)	Mark Henry (CnaG)
7th	1932	P. J. Ruttledge (FF)	Micheál Clery (FF)	Michael Davis (CnaG)	Patrick O'Hara (CnaG)
8th	1933	P. J. Ruttledge (FF)	Micheál Clery (FF)	Michael Davis (CnaG)	James Morrisroe (CnaG)
9th	1937	P. J. Ruttledge (FF)	John Munnelly (FF)	Patrick Browne (FG)	3 seats 1937–1969
10th	1938	P. J. Ruttledge (FF)	John Munnelly (FF)	Patrick Browne (FG)	3 seats 1937–1969
11th	1943	P. J. Ruttledge (FF)	James Kilroy (FF)	Patrick Browne (FG)	3 seats 1937–1969
12th	1944	P. J. Ruttledge (FF)	James Kilroy (FF)	Patrick Browne (FG)	3 seats 1937–1969
13th	1948	P. J. Ruttledge (FF)	James Kilroy (FF)	Patrick Browne (FG)	3 seats 1937–1969
14th	1951	P. J. Ruttledge (FF)	Thomas O'Hara (CnaT)	Patrick Browne (FG)	3 seats 1937–1969
14th	1952 by-election	Phelim Calleary (FF)	Thomas O'Hara (CnaT)	Patrick Browne (FG)	3 seats 1937–1969
15th	1954	Phelim Calleary (FF)	Thomas O'Hara (CnaT)	Patrick Lindsay (FG)	3 seats 1937–1969
16th	1957	Phelim Calleary (FF)	Seán Doherty (FF)	Patrick Lindsay (FG)	3 seats 1937–1969
17th	1961	Phelim Calleary (FF)	Joseph Lenehan (Ind.)	Michael Browne (FG)	3 seats 1937–1969
18th	1965	Phelim Calleary (FF)	Patrick Lindsay (FG)	Thomas O'Hara (FG)	3 seats 1937–1969
19th	1969	Constituency abolished. See Mayo East and Mayo West			

Dáil	Election	Deputy (Party)	Deputy (Party)	Deputy (Party)	Deputy (Party)	Deputy (Party)
4th	1923	Tom Maguire (Rep)	Michael Kilroy (Rep)	William Sears (CnaG)	Joseph MacBride (CnaG)	Martin Nally (CnaG)
5th	1927 (Jun)	Thomas J. O'Connell (Lab)	Michael Kilroy (FF)	Eugene Mullen (FF)	James FitzGerald-Kenney (CnaG)	Martin Nally (CnaG)
6th	1927 (Sep)	Thomas J. O'Connell (Lab)	Michael Kilroy (FF)	Richard Walsh (FF)	James FitzGerald-Kenney (CnaG)	Martin Nally (CnaG)
7th	1932	Edward Moane (FF)	Michael Kilroy (FF)	Richard Walsh (FF)	James FitzGerald-Kenney (CnaG)	Martin Nally (CnaG)
8th	1933	Edward Moane (FF)	Michael Kilroy (FF)	Richard Walsh (FF)	James FitzGerald-Kenney (CnaG)	Martin Nally (CnaG)
9th	1937	Edward Moane (FF)	Micheál Clery (FF)	Richard Walsh (FF)	James FitzGerald-Kenney (FG)	Martin Nally (FG)
10th	1938	Mícheál Ó Móráin (FF)	Micheál Clery (FF)	Richard Walsh (FF)	James FitzGerald-Kenney (FG)	Martin Nally (FG)
11th	1943	Mícheál Ó Móráin (FF)	Micheál Clery (FF)	Joseph Blowick (CnaT)	James FitzGerald-Kenney (FG)	Dominick Cafferky (CnaT)
12th	1944	Mícheál Ó Móráin (FF)	Micheál Clery (FF)	Joseph Blowick (CnaT)	Richard Walsh (FF)	Dominick Cafferky (CnaT)
12th	1945 by-election	Mícheál Ó Móráin (FF)	Bernard Commons (CnaT)	Joseph Blowick (CnaT)	Richard Walsh (FF)	Dominick Cafferky (CnaT)
13th	1948	Mícheál Ó Móráin (FF)	Bernard Commons (CnaT)	Joseph Blowick (CnaT)	Richard Walsh (FF)	4 seats 1948–1969
14th	1951	Mícheál Ó Móráin (FF)	Seán Flanagan (FF)	Joseph Blowick (CnaT)	Dominick Cafferky (CnaT)	4 seats 1948–1969
15th	1954	Mícheál Ó Móráin (FF)	Seán Flanagan (FF)	Joseph Blowick (CnaT)	Henry Kenny (FG)	4 seats 1948–1969
16th	1957	Mícheál Ó Móráin (FF)	Seán Flanagan (FF)	Joseph Blowick (CnaT)	Henry Kenny (FG)	4 seats 1948–1969
17th	1961	Mícheál Ó Móráin (FF)	Seán Flanagan (FF)	Joseph Blowick (CnaT)	Henry Kenny (FG)	4 seats 1948–1969
18th	1965	Mícheál Ó Móráin (FF)	Seán Flanagan (FF)	Michael Lyons (FG)	Henry Kenny (FG)	4 seats 1948–1969
19th	1969	Constituency abolished. See Mayo East and Mayo West				
