= James Hughes (Irish politician) =

Irish politician (1895–1948)

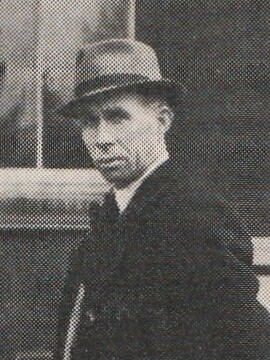
- Hughes, c. 1940s

Teachta Dála
- In office June 1938 – 1 January 1948
- Constituency: Carlow–Kildare

Personal details
- Born: 1895 County Carlow, Ireland
- Died: 1 January 1948 (aged 52–53) County Carlow, Ireland
- Party: Fine Gael

James Hughes (1895 – 1 January 1948) was an Irish Fine Gael politician. A farmer, he was elected to Dáil Éireann as a Teachta Dála (TD) for the Carlow–Kildare constituency in the 1938 general election. He was re-elected at the 1943 and 1944 general elections. He died on 1 January 1948 during the course of the 12th Dáil, which was dissolved on 12 January 1948, and no by-election was held for his seat.

Dáil	Election	Deputy (Party)	Deputy (Party)	Deputy (Party)	Deputy (Party)
9th	1937	William Norton (Lab)	Thomas Harris (FF)	Francis Humphreys (FF)	Sydney Minch (FG)
10th	1938	William Norton (Lab)	Thomas Harris (FF)	Francis Humphreys (FF)	James Hughes (FG)
11th	1943	William Norton (Lab)	Thomas Harris (FF)	Francis Humphreys (FF)	James Hughes (FG)
12th	1944	William Norton (Lab)	Thomas Harris (FF)	Francis Humphreys (FF)	James Hughes (FG)
13th	1948	Constituency abolished. See Carlow–Kilkenny and Kildare			
