= James FitzGerald-Kenney =

Irish politician (1878–1956)

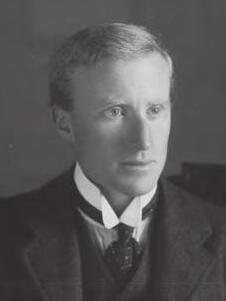
- FitzGerald-Kenney, c.1910s

Minister for Justice
- In office 12 October 1927 – 9 March 1932
- President: W. T. Cosgrave
- Preceded by: W. T. Cosgrave
- Succeeded by: James Geoghegan

Parliamentary Secretary
- 1927: Justice

Teachta Dála
- In office June 1927 – May 1944
- Constituency: Mayo South

Personal details
- Born: 1 January 1878 Claremorris, County Mayo, Ireland
- Died: 21 October 1956 (aged 78) Galway, Ireland
- Party: Fine Gael
- Other political affiliations: Cumann na nGaedheal
- Education: University College Dublin; King's Inns

James FitzGerald-Kenney (1 January 1878 – 21 October 1956) was an Irish Fine Gael politician and barrister who served as Minister for Justice from 1927 to 1932. He served as a Teachta Dála (TD) for the Mayo South constituency from 1927 to 1944.

== Biography ==
He was born at his mother's family home in Clogher, near Carnacon, County Mayo. He was the second son of James Fitzgerald-Kenney of Galway and Helena Crean-Lynch. He was educated at Clongowes Wood College and University College Dublin, where he took his degree in 1898. He was called to the Bar in 1899 and built up a large practice on the Western Circuit. He was called to the Inner Bar in 1925.

In politics, he was a supporter of John Redmond until 1918; he joined the Irish Volunteers in 1914 and became an inspecting officer for South Mayo. After the split within the Volunteers in late 1914 over whether to serve with the British Army in World War I, FitzGerald-Kenney aligned with the Redmondite National Volunteers, who opted in favour of doing so.

== Political career ==
In June 1927, he was elected as a Cumann na nGaedheal TD for Mayo South and became parliamentary secretary to acting Minister for Justice W. T. Cosgrave. Following the assassination of Kevin O’Higgins, he was appointed Minister for Justice on 11 October 1927, a position he held until 1932. His appointment as a minister after only a few months in parliament caused a surprise. As the least experienced cabinet member, he often became the focus of opposition criticism and struggled with parliamentary duties. Unlike O'Higgins, he allowed Eoin O'Duffy complete discretion as to how he ran the police force. His willingness to defend O'Duffy occasionally invited ridicule: his claim that a victim of Garda brutality had been knocked down by a cow led to a brief fashion for referring to Gardaí as "Fitzgerald-Kenney's cows".

When the Four Courts, which had been badly damaged during the Irish Civil War, reopened in 1931, he vetoed the proposal by the Chief Justice of Ireland Hugh Kennedy to hold a formal ceremony to mark the occasion, on the ground that it would virtually amount to an invitation to extremists to attack the building again.

Following the merger of Cumann na nGaedheal with the National Centre Party and the Army Comrades Association (better known as the Blueshirts) to form Fine Gael in September 1933, he lost his front bench seat. He was involved with the Blueshirts and led its youth section.

After losing his seat in the 1944 general election, he declined a nomination to Seanad Éireann by the bar council and chose to retire from politics to focus on his legal career. He spent his remaining years farming at Clogher.

== Personal life ==
A supporter of the Irish language, Fitzgerald-Kenney was an early member of the Gaelic League in Mayo, where he established and chaired the local branch. His interests included shooting and golf. In addition to his political and legal careers, he managed the large estate at Clogher House, Mayo, which he inherited from his mother in 1903.

FitzGerald-Kenney died on 21 October 1956, in a Dublin nursing home, leaving an estate valued at £3,713. He never married, and his papers are preserved in the James Hardiman Library at the National University of Ireland, Galway.

Political offices
New office	Parliamentary Secretary to the Minister for Justice; 1927	Office abolished
Preceded by W. T. Cosgrave	Minister for Justice; 1927–1932	Succeeded by James Geoghegan

Dáil	Election	Deputy (Party)	Deputy (Party)	Deputy (Party)	Deputy (Party)	Deputy (Party)
4th	1923	Tom Maguire (Rep)	Michael Kilroy (Rep)	William Sears (CnaG)	Joseph MacBride (CnaG)	Martin Nally (CnaG)
5th	1927 (Jun)	Thomas J. O'Connell (Lab)	Michael Kilroy (FF)	Eugene Mullen (FF)	James FitzGerald-Kenney (CnaG)	Martin Nally (CnaG)
6th	1927 (Sep)	Thomas J. O'Connell (Lab)	Michael Kilroy (FF)	Richard Walsh (FF)	James FitzGerald-Kenney (CnaG)	Martin Nally (CnaG)
7th	1932	Edward Moane (FF)	Michael Kilroy (FF)	Richard Walsh (FF)	James FitzGerald-Kenney (CnaG)	Martin Nally (CnaG)
8th	1933	Edward Moane (FF)	Michael Kilroy (FF)	Richard Walsh (FF)	James FitzGerald-Kenney (CnaG)	Martin Nally (CnaG)
9th	1937	Edward Moane (FF)	Micheál Clery (FF)	Richard Walsh (FF)	James FitzGerald-Kenney (FG)	Martin Nally (FG)
10th	1938	Mícheál Ó Móráin (FF)	Micheál Clery (FF)	Richard Walsh (FF)	James FitzGerald-Kenney (FG)	Martin Nally (FG)
11th	1943	Mícheál Ó Móráin (FF)	Micheál Clery (FF)	Joseph Blowick (CnaT)	James FitzGerald-Kenney (FG)	Dominick Cafferky (CnaT)
12th	1944	Mícheál Ó Móráin (FF)	Micheál Clery (FF)	Joseph Blowick (CnaT)	Richard Walsh (FF)	Dominick Cafferky (CnaT)
12th	1945 by-election	Mícheál Ó Móráin (FF)	Bernard Commons (CnaT)	Joseph Blowick (CnaT)	Richard Walsh (FF)	Dominick Cafferky (CnaT)
13th	1948	Mícheál Ó Móráin (FF)	Bernard Commons (CnaT)	Joseph Blowick (CnaT)	Richard Walsh (FF)	4 seats 1948–1969
14th	1951	Mícheál Ó Móráin (FF)	Seán Flanagan (FF)	Joseph Blowick (CnaT)	Dominick Cafferky (CnaT)	4 seats 1948–1969
15th	1954	Mícheál Ó Móráin (FF)	Seán Flanagan (FF)	Joseph Blowick (CnaT)	Henry Kenny (FG)	4 seats 1948–1969
16th	1957	Mícheál Ó Móráin (FF)	Seán Flanagan (FF)	Joseph Blowick (CnaT)	Henry Kenny (FG)	4 seats 1948–1969
17th	1961	Mícheál Ó Móráin (FF)	Seán Flanagan (FF)	Joseph Blowick (CnaT)	Henry Kenny (FG)	4 seats 1948–1969
18th	1965	Mícheál Ó Móráin (FF)	Seán Flanagan (FF)	Michael Lyons (FG)	Henry Kenny (FG)	4 seats 1948–1969
19th	1969	Constituency abolished. See Mayo East and Mayo West				
