= 1945 Dublin North-West by-election =

By-election to the 12th Dáil

- 4 December 1945
- Turnout: 19,900 (28.3%)
	De Valera	Breen
Nominee	Vivion de Valera	John Breen
Party	Fianna Fáil	Labour
First preferences	13,503	6,397
Percentage	67.9%	32.2%
TD before election
Seán T. O'Kelly
Fianna Fáil
TD after election
Vivion de Valera
Fianna Fáil

A Dáil by-election was held in the constituency of Dublin North-West in Ireland on Tuesday, 4 December 1945, to fill a vacancy in the 12th Dáil. It followed the election of Fianna Fáil TD Seán T. O'Kelly as president of Ireland. Under Article 12.6.2° of the Constitution of Ireland, a member of either House of the Oireachtas who is elected as president is deemed to have vacated that seat. O'Kelly was declared elected as president on 18 June 1945.

In 1945, Dublin North-West was a five-seat constituency containing the Arran Quay, Glasnevin, Inns Quay, North City and Rotunda wards, part of Mountjoy ward, and certain townlands which had been transferred from Dublin County.

The writ of election to fill the vacancy was agreed by the Dáil on 14 November 1945.

The by-election was won by the Fianna Fáil candidate Vivion de Valera, son of the Taoiseach Éamon de Valera.

Four other by-elections were held on the same day: in Clare, Kerry South, Mayo South and Wexford. Three by-elections were won by Fianna Fáil, one by Clann na Talmhan, and one by Labour.

== Result ==
1945 Dublin North-West by-election
Party	Candidate	FPv%	Count
Party	Candidate	FPv%	1
Fianna Fáil	Vivion de Valera	67.9	13,503
Labour	John Breen	32.2	6,397
Electorate: 70,331 Valid: 19,900 Quota: 9,951 Turnout: 28.3%
