= Michael Lyons (politician) =

Irish politician (1910–1991)

Senator
- In office 5 November 1969 – 8 October 1981
- Constituency: Labour Panel

Teachta Dála
- In office April 1965 – June 1969
- Constituency: Mayo South

Personal details
- Born: 1 November 1910 County Mayo, Ireland
- Died: 19 November 1991 (aged 81) County Mayo, Ireland
- Party: Fine Gael

Michael Dalgan Lyons (1 November 1910 – 19 November 1991) was an Irish Fine Gael politician from Ballyhaunis, County Mayo.

A farmer and former employee of the Irish Sugar Company, he stood unsuccessfully as a Fine Gael candidate for Dáil Éireann in the Mayo South constituency at three successive general elections (1954, 1957, and 1961) before finally winning the seat at the 1965 general election to the 18th Dáil. He served only one term in the Dáil, losing his seat at the 1969 general election.

Lyons did not stand for the Dáil again, but after his 1969 defeat he was elected to the 12th Seanad on the Labour Panel. He was re-elected in 1973 to the 13th Seanad and in 1977 to the 14th Seanad, but did not contest the 1981 Seanad election.

Dáil	Election	Deputy (Party)	Deputy (Party)	Deputy (Party)	Deputy (Party)	Deputy (Party)
4th	1923	Tom Maguire (Rep)	Michael Kilroy (Rep)	William Sears (CnaG)	Joseph MacBride (CnaG)	Martin Nally (CnaG)
5th	1927 (Jun)	Thomas J. O'Connell (Lab)	Michael Kilroy (FF)	Eugene Mullen (FF)	James FitzGerald-Kenney (CnaG)	Martin Nally (CnaG)
6th	1927 (Sep)	Thomas J. O'Connell (Lab)	Michael Kilroy (FF)	Richard Walsh (FF)	James FitzGerald-Kenney (CnaG)	Martin Nally (CnaG)
7th	1932	Edward Moane (FF)	Michael Kilroy (FF)	Richard Walsh (FF)	James FitzGerald-Kenney (CnaG)	Martin Nally (CnaG)
8th	1933	Edward Moane (FF)	Michael Kilroy (FF)	Richard Walsh (FF)	James FitzGerald-Kenney (CnaG)	Martin Nally (CnaG)
9th	1937	Edward Moane (FF)	Micheál Clery (FF)	Richard Walsh (FF)	James FitzGerald-Kenney (FG)	Martin Nally (FG)
10th	1938	Mícheál Ó Móráin (FF)	Micheál Clery (FF)	Richard Walsh (FF)	James FitzGerald-Kenney (FG)	Martin Nally (FG)
11th	1943	Mícheál Ó Móráin (FF)	Micheál Clery (FF)	Joseph Blowick (CnaT)	James FitzGerald-Kenney (FG)	Dominick Cafferky (CnaT)
12th	1944	Mícheál Ó Móráin (FF)	Micheál Clery (FF)	Joseph Blowick (CnaT)	Richard Walsh (FF)	Dominick Cafferky (CnaT)
12th	1945 by-election	Mícheál Ó Móráin (FF)	Bernard Commons (CnaT)	Joseph Blowick (CnaT)	Richard Walsh (FF)	Dominick Cafferky (CnaT)
13th	1948	Mícheál Ó Móráin (FF)	Bernard Commons (CnaT)	Joseph Blowick (CnaT)	Richard Walsh (FF)	4 seats 1948–1969
14th	1951	Mícheál Ó Móráin (FF)	Seán Flanagan (FF)	Joseph Blowick (CnaT)	Dominick Cafferky (CnaT)	4 seats 1948–1969
15th	1954	Mícheál Ó Móráin (FF)	Seán Flanagan (FF)	Joseph Blowick (CnaT)	Henry Kenny (FG)	4 seats 1948–1969
16th	1957	Mícheál Ó Móráin (FF)	Seán Flanagan (FF)	Joseph Blowick (CnaT)	Henry Kenny (FG)	4 seats 1948–1969
17th	1961	Mícheál Ó Móráin (FF)	Seán Flanagan (FF)	Joseph Blowick (CnaT)	Henry Kenny (FG)	4 seats 1948–1969
18th	1965	Mícheál Ó Móráin (FF)	Seán Flanagan (FF)	Michael Lyons (FG)	Henry Kenny (FG)	4 seats 1948–1969
19th	1969	Constituency abolished. See Mayo East and Mayo West				
