= 1945 Mayo South by-election =

By-election to the 12th Dáil

- 4 December 1945
- Turnout: 31,838 (55.1%)
	Commons	Gilmartin
Nominee	Bernard Commons	Charles Gilmartin
Party	Clann na Talmhan	Fianna Fáil
First preferences	16,977	14,861
Percentage	53.3%	46.7%
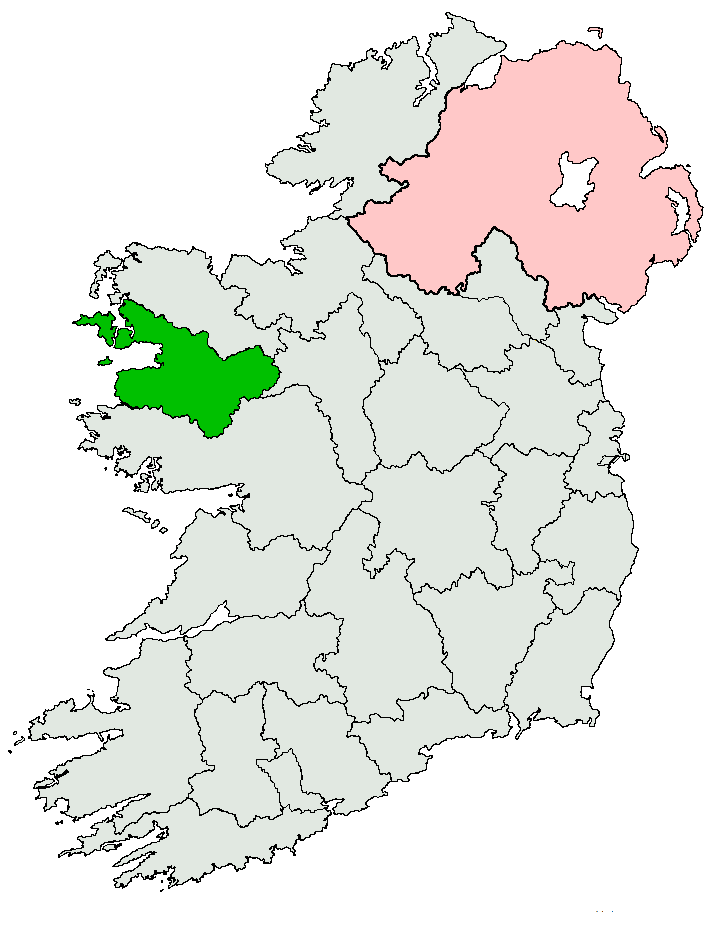
- Mayo South shown within Ireland
TD before election
Micheál Clery
Fianna Fáil
TD after election
Bernard Commons
Clann na Talmhan

A Dáil by-election was held in the constituency of Mayo South in Ireland on Tuesday, 4 December 1945, to fill a vacancy in the 12th Dáil. It followed the resignation of Fianna Fáil TD Micheál Clery on 10 October 1945, after his appointment as county registrar of Dublin.

In 1945, Mayo South was a five seat constituency comprising the electoral areas of Castlebar, Claremorris and Westport in County Mayo.

The writ of election to fill the vacancy was agreed by the Dáil on 14 November 1945.

The by-election was won by the Clann na Talmhan candidate Bernard Commons.

Four other by-elections were held on the same day: in Clare, Dublin North-West, Kerry South and Wexford. Three by-elections were won by Fianna Fáil, one by Clann na Talmhan, and one by Labour.

== Result ==
1945 Mayo South by-election
Party	Candidate	FPv%	Count
Party	Candidate	FPv%	1
Clann na Talmhan	Bernard Commons	53.3	16,977
Fianna Fáil	Charles Gilmartin	46.7	14,861
Electorate: 57,775 Valid: 31,838 Quota: 15,920 Turnout: 55.1%
