= Edward Moane =

Irish politician (1890–1973)

Teachta Dála
- In office February 1932 – June 1938
- Constituency: Mayo South

Personal details
- Born: 2 August 1890 County Mayo, Ireland
- Died: 11 July 1973 (aged 82) County Mayo, Ireland
- Party: Fianna Fáil

Edward Moane (2 August 1890 – 11 July 1973) was an Irish politician and farmer. He was first elected to Dáil Éireann as a Fianna Fáil Teachta Dála (TD) for the Mayo South constituency at the 1932 general election. He was re-elected at the 1933 and 1937 general elections but lost his seat at the 1938 general election.

| Dáil | Election | Deputy (Party) | Deputy (Party) | Deputy (Party) | Deputy (Party) | Deputy (Party) |
|---|---|---|---|---|---|---|
| 4th | 1923 | Tom Maguire (Rep) | Michael Kilroy (Rep) | William Sears (CnaG) | Joseph MacBride (CnaG) | Martin Nally (CnaG) |
| 5th | 1927 (Jun) | Thomas J. O'Connell (Lab) | Michael Kilroy (FF) | Eugene Mullen (FF) | James FitzGerald-Kenney (CnaG) | Martin Nally (CnaG) |
| 6th | 1927 (Sep) | Thomas J. O'Connell (Lab) | Michael Kilroy (FF) | Richard Walsh (FF) | James FitzGerald-Kenney (CnaG) | Martin Nally (CnaG) |
| 7th | 1932 | Edward Moane (FF) | Michael Kilroy (FF) | Richard Walsh (FF) | James FitzGerald-Kenney (CnaG) | Martin Nally (CnaG) |
| 8th | 1933 | Edward Moane (FF) | Michael Kilroy (FF) | Richard Walsh (FF) | James FitzGerald-Kenney (CnaG) | Martin Nally (CnaG) |
| 9th | 1937 | Edward Moane (FF) | Micheál Clery (FF) | Richard Walsh (FF) | James FitzGerald-Kenney (FG) | Martin Nally (FG) |
| 10th | 1938 | Mícheál Ó Móráin (FF) | Micheál Clery (FF) | Richard Walsh (FF) | James FitzGerald-Kenney (FG) | Martin Nally (FG) |
| 11th | 1943 | Mícheál Ó Móráin (FF) | Micheál Clery (FF) | Joseph Blowick (CnaT) | James FitzGerald-Kenney (FG) | Dominick Cafferky (CnaT) |
| 12th | 1944 | Mícheál Ó Móráin (FF) | Micheál Clery (FF) | Joseph Blowick (CnaT) | Richard Walsh (FF) | Dominick Cafferky (CnaT) |
| 12th | 1945 by-election | Mícheál Ó Móráin (FF) | Bernard Commons (CnaT) | Joseph Blowick (CnaT) | Richard Walsh (FF) | Dominick Cafferky (CnaT) |
| 13th | 1948 | Mícheál Ó Móráin (FF) | Bernard Commons (CnaT) | Joseph Blowick (CnaT) | Richard Walsh (FF) | 4 seats 1948–1969 |
| 14th | 1951 | Mícheál Ó Móráin (FF) | Seán Flanagan (FF) | Joseph Blowick (CnaT) | Dominick Cafferky (CnaT) | 4 seats 1948–1969 |
| 15th | 1954 | Mícheál Ó Móráin (FF) | Seán Flanagan (FF) | Joseph Blowick (CnaT) | Henry Kenny (FG) | 4 seats 1948–1969 |
| 16th | 1957 | Mícheál Ó Móráin (FF) | Seán Flanagan (FF) | Joseph Blowick (CnaT) | Henry Kenny (FG) | 4 seats 1948–1969 |
| 17th | 1961 | Mícheál Ó Móráin (FF) | Seán Flanagan (FF) | Joseph Blowick (CnaT) | Henry Kenny (FG) | 4 seats 1948–1969 |
| 18th | 1965 | Mícheál Ó Móráin (FF) | Seán Flanagan (FF) | Michael Lyons (FG) | Henry Kenny (FG) | 4 seats 1948–1969 |
| 19th | 1969 | Constituency abolished. See Mayo East and Mayo West | | | | |
