= Martin Nally =

Irish politician (1882–1966)

Teachta Dála
- In office August 1923 – June 1943
- Constituency: Mayo South

Personal details
- Born: 1882 County Mayo, Ireland
- Died: 1 August 1966 (aged 83–84) County Mayo, Ireland
- Party: Fine Gael; Cumann na nGaedheal

Martin Nally (1882 – 1 August 1966) was an Irish politician and farmer. He was first elected to Dáil Éireann as a Cumann na nGaedheal Teachta Dála (TD) for the Mayo South constituency at the 1923 general election.

He was re-elected at each subsequent election until he lost his seat at the 1943 general election. From September 1933 on, he was elected as a Fine Gael TD.

Dáil	Election	Deputy (Party)	Deputy (Party)	Deputy (Party)	Deputy (Party)	Deputy (Party)
4th	1923	Tom Maguire (Rep)	Michael Kilroy (Rep)	William Sears (CnaG)	Joseph MacBride (CnaG)	Martin Nally (CnaG)
5th	1927 (Jun)	Thomas J. O'Connell (Lab)	Michael Kilroy (FF)	Eugene Mullen (FF)	James FitzGerald-Kenney (CnaG)	Martin Nally (CnaG)
6th	1927 (Sep)	Thomas J. O'Connell (Lab)	Michael Kilroy (FF)	Richard Walsh (FF)	James FitzGerald-Kenney (CnaG)	Martin Nally (CnaG)
7th	1932	Edward Moane (FF)	Michael Kilroy (FF)	Richard Walsh (FF)	James FitzGerald-Kenney (CnaG)	Martin Nally (CnaG)
8th	1933	Edward Moane (FF)	Michael Kilroy (FF)	Richard Walsh (FF)	James FitzGerald-Kenney (CnaG)	Martin Nally (CnaG)
9th	1937	Edward Moane (FF)	Micheál Clery (FF)	Richard Walsh (FF)	James FitzGerald-Kenney (FG)	Martin Nally (FG)
10th	1938	Mícheál Ó Móráin (FF)	Micheál Clery (FF)	Richard Walsh (FF)	James FitzGerald-Kenney (FG)	Martin Nally (FG)
11th	1943	Mícheál Ó Móráin (FF)	Micheál Clery (FF)	Joseph Blowick (CnaT)	James FitzGerald-Kenney (FG)	Dominick Cafferky (CnaT)
12th	1944	Mícheál Ó Móráin (FF)	Micheál Clery (FF)	Joseph Blowick (CnaT)	Richard Walsh (FF)	Dominick Cafferky (CnaT)
12th	1945 by-election	Mícheál Ó Móráin (FF)	Bernard Commons (CnaT)	Joseph Blowick (CnaT)	Richard Walsh (FF)	Dominick Cafferky (CnaT)
13th	1948	Mícheál Ó Móráin (FF)	Bernard Commons (CnaT)	Joseph Blowick (CnaT)	Richard Walsh (FF)	4 seats 1948–1969
14th	1951	Mícheál Ó Móráin (FF)	Seán Flanagan (FF)	Joseph Blowick (CnaT)	Dominick Cafferky (CnaT)	4 seats 1948–1969
15th	1954	Mícheál Ó Móráin (FF)	Seán Flanagan (FF)	Joseph Blowick (CnaT)	Henry Kenny (FG)	4 seats 1948–1969
16th	1957	Mícheál Ó Móráin (FF)	Seán Flanagan (FF)	Joseph Blowick (CnaT)	Henry Kenny (FG)	4 seats 1948–1969
17th	1961	Mícheál Ó Móráin (FF)	Seán Flanagan (FF)	Joseph Blowick (CnaT)	Henry Kenny (FG)	4 seats 1948–1969
18th	1965	Mícheál Ó Móráin (FF)	Seán Flanagan (FF)	Michael Lyons (FG)	Henry Kenny (FG)	4 seats 1948–1969
19th	1969	Constituency abolished. See Mayo East and Mayo West				
