= Bernard Commons =

Irish politician (1913–1965

Senator
- In office 14 August 1951 – 22 May 1957
- Constituency: Agricultural Panel

Teachta Dála
- In office December 1945 – May 1951
- Constituency: Mayo South

Personal details
- Born: 15 May 1913 County Mayo, Ireland
- Died: 19 April 1965 (aged 51)
- Party: Clann na Talmhan

Bernard Commons (15 May 1913 – 19 April 1965) was an Irish politician. A farmer by profession, he was an unsuccessful candidate at the 1943 and 1944 general elections. He was elected to Dáil Éireann at the Mayo South by-election on 4 December 1945 as a Clann na Talmhan Teachta Dála (TD) for the Mayo South constituency. The by-election was caused by the appointment of Micheál Clery of Fianna Fáil as County Registrar of Dublin.

He was re-elected at the 1948 general election but lost his seat at the 1951 general election. He was subsequently elected to 7th Seanad by the Agricultural Panel. He stood unsuccessfully at the 1954 general election but was elected to the 8th Seanad. He was defeated at the 1957 Seanad election.

In the early 1940s, Commons was imprisoned for one month in Sligo Prison for his part in the Mayo land agitation, after which he won a Dáil seat.

== See also ==
- List of members of the Oireachtas imprisoned since 1923

Dáil	Election	Deputy (Party)	Deputy (Party)	Deputy (Party)	Deputy (Party)	Deputy (Party)
4th	1923	Tom Maguire (Rep)	Michael Kilroy (Rep)	William Sears (CnaG)	Joseph MacBride (CnaG)	Martin Nally (CnaG)
5th	1927 (Jun)	Thomas J. O'Connell (Lab)	Michael Kilroy (FF)	Eugene Mullen (FF)	James FitzGerald-Kenney (CnaG)	Martin Nally (CnaG)
6th	1927 (Sep)	Thomas J. O'Connell (Lab)	Michael Kilroy (FF)	Richard Walsh (FF)	James FitzGerald-Kenney (CnaG)	Martin Nally (CnaG)
7th	1932	Edward Moane (FF)	Michael Kilroy (FF)	Richard Walsh (FF)	James FitzGerald-Kenney (CnaG)	Martin Nally (CnaG)
8th	1933	Edward Moane (FF)	Michael Kilroy (FF)	Richard Walsh (FF)	James FitzGerald-Kenney (CnaG)	Martin Nally (CnaG)
9th	1937	Edward Moane (FF)	Micheál Clery (FF)	Richard Walsh (FF)	James FitzGerald-Kenney (FG)	Martin Nally (FG)
10th	1938	Mícheál Ó Móráin (FF)	Micheál Clery (FF)	Richard Walsh (FF)	James FitzGerald-Kenney (FG)	Martin Nally (FG)
11th	1943	Mícheál Ó Móráin (FF)	Micheál Clery (FF)	Joseph Blowick (CnaT)	James FitzGerald-Kenney (FG)	Dominick Cafferky (CnaT)
12th	1944	Mícheál Ó Móráin (FF)	Micheál Clery (FF)	Joseph Blowick (CnaT)	Richard Walsh (FF)	Dominick Cafferky (CnaT)
12th	1945 by-election	Mícheál Ó Móráin (FF)	Bernard Commons (CnaT)	Joseph Blowick (CnaT)	Richard Walsh (FF)	Dominick Cafferky (CnaT)
13th	1948	Mícheál Ó Móráin (FF)	Bernard Commons (CnaT)	Joseph Blowick (CnaT)	Richard Walsh (FF)	4 seats 1948–1969
14th	1951	Mícheál Ó Móráin (FF)	Seán Flanagan (FF)	Joseph Blowick (CnaT)	Dominick Cafferky (CnaT)	4 seats 1948–1969
15th	1954	Mícheál Ó Móráin (FF)	Seán Flanagan (FF)	Joseph Blowick (CnaT)	Henry Kenny (FG)	4 seats 1948–1969
16th	1957	Mícheál Ó Móráin (FF)	Seán Flanagan (FF)	Joseph Blowick (CnaT)	Henry Kenny (FG)	4 seats 1948–1969
17th	1961	Mícheál Ó Móráin (FF)	Seán Flanagan (FF)	Joseph Blowick (CnaT)	Henry Kenny (FG)	4 seats 1948–1969
18th	1965	Mícheál Ó Móráin (FF)	Seán Flanagan (FF)	Michael Lyons (FG)	Henry Kenny (FG)	4 seats 1948–1969
19th	1969	Constituency abolished. See Mayo East and Mayo West				
