= Mícheál Ó Móráin =

Irish politician (1912–1983)

Minister for Justice
- In office 27 March 1968 – 5 May 1970
- Taoiseach: Jack Lynch
- Preceded by: Brian Lenihan
- Succeeded by: Desmond O'Malley

Minister for the Gaeltacht
- In office 11 October 1961 – 26 March 1968
- Taoiseach: Seán Lemass; Jack Lynch
- Preceded by: Gerald Bartley
- Succeeded by: Pádraig Faulkner
- In office 26 June 1957 – 23 July 1959
- Taoiseach: Éamon de Valera
- Preceded by: Jack Lynch
- Succeeded by: Gerald Bartley

Minister for Lands
- In office 23 July 1959 – 26 March 1968
- Taoiseach: Seán Lemass; Jack Lynch
- Preceded by: Erskine Childers
- Succeeded by: Pádraig Faulkner

Teachta Dála
- In office June 1969 – February 1973
- Constituency: Mayo West
- In office June 1938 – June 1969
- Constituency: Mayo South

Personal details
- Born: 24 December 1911 Castlebar, County Mayo, Ireland
- Died: 6 May 1983 (aged 71) Castlebar, County Mayo, Ireland
- Party: Fianna Fáil
- Spouse: Madge Ó Móráin
- Children: 3
- Education: University College Dublin

Mícheál Ó Móráin (24 December 1911 – 6 May 1983) was an Irish Fianna Fáil politician who served as Minister for Justice from 1968 to 1970, Minister for the Gaeltacht from 1957 to 1959 and 1961 to 1968 and Minister for Lands from 1959 to 1968. He served as Teachta Dála (TD) from 1938 to 1973.

Ó Móráin was born in Castlebar, County Mayo, hailing from a strong Republican family, members of which had fought in the Irish War of Independence, and in the Irish Civil War on the Anti-Treaty side. He was eduacted at St Gerald's College, Castlebar, and University College Dublin. A solicitor by profession, Ó Móráin was first elected to Dáil Éireann for the Mayo South constituency on his second attempt at the 1938 general election. He remained on the backbenches for several years until he was appointed to the cabinet by Taoiseach Éamon de Valera in 1957 as Minister for the Gaeltacht. He was a native Irish speaker. He was appointed Minister for Lands by Taoiseach Seán Lemass, in 1959 and was re-appointed to the Gaeltacht portfolio in 1961. He remained in these two Departments until 1968.

Ireland formally applied for EEC membership in July 1961. Ó Móráin, as Minister for Lands and the Gaeltacht, delivered a widely reported address to the Castlebar Chamber of Commerce in 1962. In the speech, he argued that Ireland was "ready to subscribe to the political aims of the EEC" and that Ireland didn't want to be seen as "committed" to its policy of neutrality. In the ensuing controversy, Ó Móráin and Lemass denied that there was any suggestion Ireland might or should abandon neutrality. Outside the country, foreign governments saw this episode as a deliberately provoked debate to evaluate the government's domestic room for manoeuvre on neutrality.

Ó Móráin was appointed Minister for Justice by Taoiseach Jack Lynch in 1968. It is in this role that he is most remembered. While Ó Móráin was still Minister, the Arms Crisis in Ireland erupted in 1970. This political scandal saw Government ministers Charles Haughey and Neil Blaney dismissed by the Taoiseach for alleged involvement in a conspiracy to smuggle arms to the Irish Republican Army in Northern Ireland. Ó Móráin continually suffered from ill health, which was accentuated by his alcoholism. When the Arms Crisis erupted, Lynch came to see Ó Móráin in a hospital in Galway and asked for his resignation. Ó Móráin was a witness at the subsequent Arms Trial. He testified that he had passed on Garda intelligence reports about the involvement of ministers with the IRA to the Taoiseach before the arms were seized at Dublin Airport. Ó Móráin's evidence at the trial has been described as "erratic".

Ó Móráin lost his Dáil seat at the 1973 general election and retired from politics. He died in Castlebar, County Mayo, on 6 May 1983.

Political offices
Preceded by Jack Lynch	Minister for the Gaeltacht; 1957–1959	Succeeded by Gerald Bartley
Preceded by Erskine H. Childers	Minister for Lands; 1959–1968	Succeeded by Pádraig Faulkner
Preceded by Gerald Bartley	Minister for the Gaeltacht; 1961–1968	Succeeded by Pádraig Faulkner
Preceded by Brian Lenihan	Minister for Justice; 1968–1970	Succeeded by Desmond O'Malley

Dáil	Election	Deputy (Party)	Deputy (Party)	Deputy (Party)	Deputy (Party)	Deputy (Party)
4th	1923	Tom Maguire (Rep)	Michael Kilroy (Rep)	William Sears (CnaG)	Joseph MacBride (CnaG)	Martin Nally (CnaG)
5th	1927 (Jun)	Thomas J. O'Connell (Lab)	Michael Kilroy (FF)	Eugene Mullen (FF)	James FitzGerald-Kenney (CnaG)	Martin Nally (CnaG)
6th	1927 (Sep)	Thomas J. O'Connell (Lab)	Michael Kilroy (FF)	Richard Walsh (FF)	James FitzGerald-Kenney (CnaG)	Martin Nally (CnaG)
7th	1932	Edward Moane (FF)	Michael Kilroy (FF)	Richard Walsh (FF)	James FitzGerald-Kenney (CnaG)	Martin Nally (CnaG)
8th	1933	Edward Moane (FF)	Michael Kilroy (FF)	Richard Walsh (FF)	James FitzGerald-Kenney (CnaG)	Martin Nally (CnaG)
9th	1937	Edward Moane (FF)	Micheál Clery (FF)	Richard Walsh (FF)	James FitzGerald-Kenney (FG)	Martin Nally (FG)
10th	1938	Mícheál Ó Móráin (FF)	Micheál Clery (FF)	Richard Walsh (FF)	James FitzGerald-Kenney (FG)	Martin Nally (FG)
11th	1943	Mícheál Ó Móráin (FF)	Micheál Clery (FF)	Joseph Blowick (CnaT)	James FitzGerald-Kenney (FG)	Dominick Cafferky (CnaT)
12th	1944	Mícheál Ó Móráin (FF)	Micheál Clery (FF)	Joseph Blowick (CnaT)	Richard Walsh (FF)	Dominick Cafferky (CnaT)
12th	1945 by-election	Mícheál Ó Móráin (FF)	Bernard Commons (CnaT)	Joseph Blowick (CnaT)	Richard Walsh (FF)	Dominick Cafferky (CnaT)
13th	1948	Mícheál Ó Móráin (FF)	Bernard Commons (CnaT)	Joseph Blowick (CnaT)	Richard Walsh (FF)	4 seats 1948–1969
14th	1951	Mícheál Ó Móráin (FF)	Seán Flanagan (FF)	Joseph Blowick (CnaT)	Dominick Cafferky (CnaT)	4 seats 1948–1969
15th	1954	Mícheál Ó Móráin (FF)	Seán Flanagan (FF)	Joseph Blowick (CnaT)	Henry Kenny (FG)	4 seats 1948–1969
16th	1957	Mícheál Ó Móráin (FF)	Seán Flanagan (FF)	Joseph Blowick (CnaT)	Henry Kenny (FG)	4 seats 1948–1969
17th	1961	Mícheál Ó Móráin (FF)	Seán Flanagan (FF)	Joseph Blowick (CnaT)	Henry Kenny (FG)	4 seats 1948–1969
18th	1965	Mícheál Ó Móráin (FF)	Seán Flanagan (FF)	Michael Lyons (FG)	Henry Kenny (FG)	4 seats 1948–1969
19th	1969	Constituency abolished. See Mayo East and Mayo West				

Dáil	Election	Deputy (Party)	Deputy (Party)	Deputy (Party)
19th	1969	Mícheál Ó Móráin (FF)	Joseph Lenehan (FF)	Henry Kenny (FG)
20th	1973	Denis Gallagher (FF)	Myles Staunton (FG)	Henry Kenny (FG)
20th	1975 by-election	Denis Gallagher (FF)	Myles Staunton (FG)	Enda Kenny (FG)
21st	1977	Denis Gallagher (FF)	Pádraig Flynn (FF)	Enda Kenny (FG)
22nd	1981	Denis Gallagher (FF)	Pádraig Flynn (FF)	Enda Kenny (FG)
23rd	1982 (Feb)	Denis Gallagher (FF)	Pádraig Flynn (FF)	Enda Kenny (FG)
24th	1982 (Nov)	Denis Gallagher (FF)	Pádraig Flynn (FF)	Enda Kenny (FG)
25th	1987	Denis Gallagher (FF)	Pádraig Flynn (FF)	Enda Kenny (FG)
26th	1989	Martin O'Toole (FF)	Pádraig Flynn (FF)	Enda Kenny (FG)
27th	1992	Séamus Hughes (FF)	Pádraig Flynn (FF)	Enda Kenny (FG)
27th	1994 by-election	Séamus Hughes (FF)	Michael Ring (FG)	Enda Kenny (FG)
28th	1997	Constituency abolished. See Mayo		
