= 1957 Irish general election =

Election to the 16th Dáil

- 5 March 1957

147 seats in Dáil Éireann (Note: Including Patrick Hogan (Lab), returned automatically for Clare as outgoing Ceann Comhairle, under Art. 16.6 of the Constitution and the Electoral (Chairman of Dáil Éireann) Act 1937.) 74 seats needed for a majority
- Turnout: 71.3% ▼5.2 pp
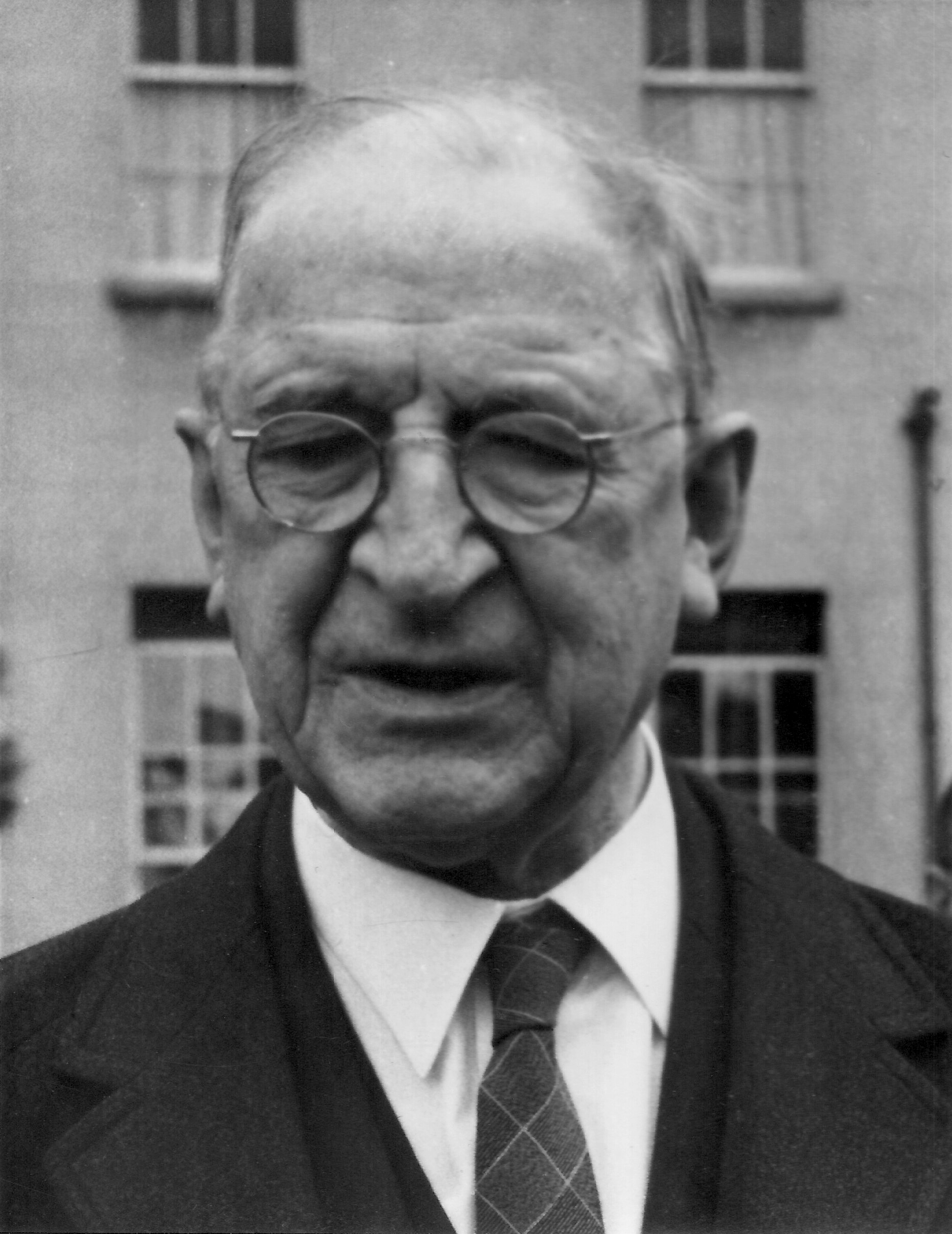

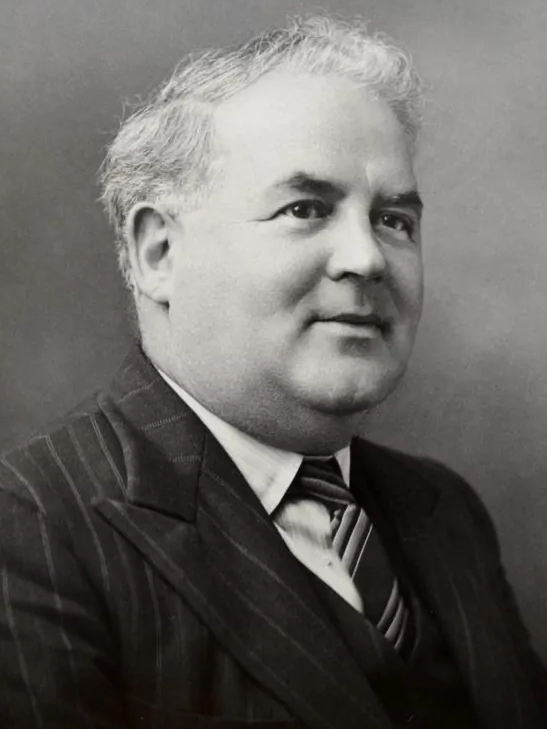

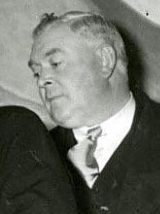

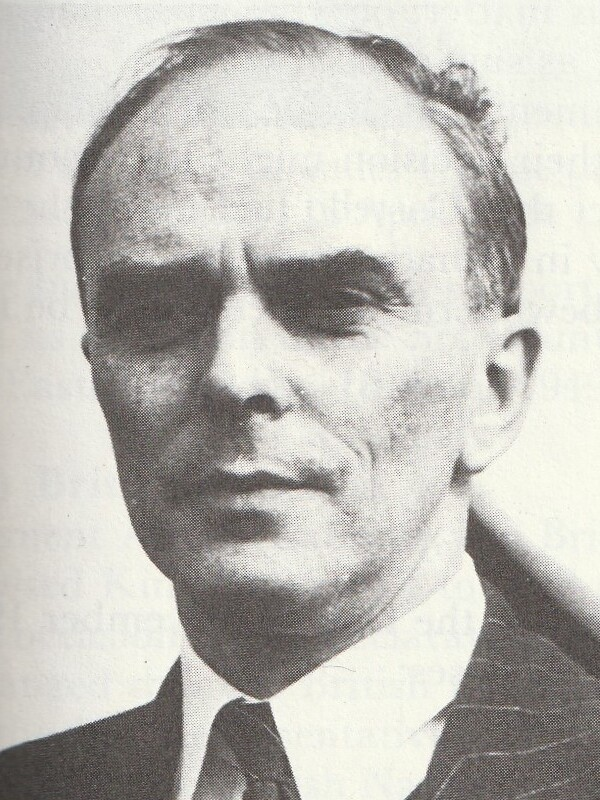
	First party	Second party	Third party
Leader	Éamon de Valera	Richard Mulcahy	William Norton
Party	Fianna Fáil	Fine Gael	Labour
Leader since	26 March 1926	1944	1932
Leader's seat	Clare	Tipperary South	Kildare
Last election	65 seats, 43.4%	50 seats, 32.0%	19 seats, 12.1%
Seats won	78	40	12
Seat change	▲13	▼10	▼7
Popular vote	592,994	326,699	111,747
Percentage	48.3%	26.6%	9.1%
Swing	▲4.9 pp	▼5.4 pp	▼3.0 pp
	Fourth party	Fifth party	Sixth party
	SF
Leader	Paddy McLogan	Joseph Blowick	Seán MacBride
Party	Sinn Féin	Clann na Talmhan	Clann na Poblachta
Leader since	1950	1944	1946
Leader's seat	N/A	Mayo South	Dublin South-West (defeated)
Last election	0 seats, 0.1%	5 seats, 3.8%	3 seats, 3.1%
Seats won	4	3	1
Seat change	▲4	▼2	▼2
Popular vote	65,640	28,905	20,632
Percentage	5.4%	2.4%	1.7%
Swing	▲5.3 pp	▼1.4 pp	▼1.4 pp
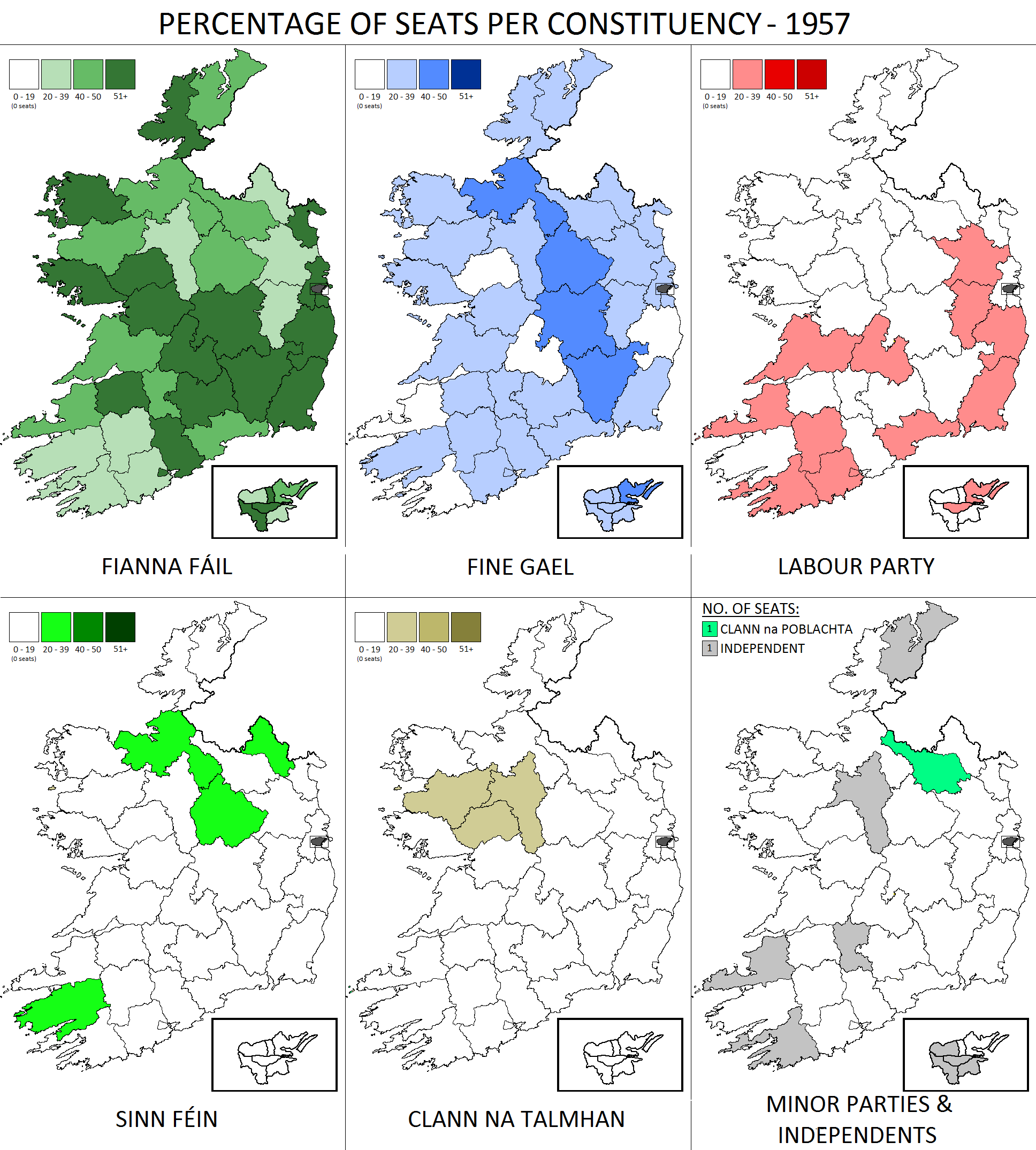
Taoiseach before election
John A. Costello
Fine Gael
Taoiseach after election
Éamon de Valera
Fianna Fáil

The 1957 Irish general election to the 16th Dáil was held on Tuesday, 5 March, following a dissolution of the 15th Dáil on 12 February by President Seán T. O'Kelly on the request of Taoiseach John A. Costello on 4 February. It was the longest election campaign in the history of the state, spanning 30 days. The general election took place in 40 Dáil constituencies throughout Ireland for 147 seats in Dáil Éireann, the house of representatives of the Oireachtas.

The 16th Dáil met at Leinster House on 20 March to nominate the Taoiseach for appointment by the president and to approve the appointment of a new government of Ireland. Costello lost office, and Éamon de Valera was appointed Taoiseach, forming the 8th government of Ireland, a single-party majority Fianna Fáil government.

== Campaign ==
The 1957 general election was precipitated by the crisis in the trade balance and the government's reaction to it. As a result of this crisis, Fianna Fáil tabled a motion of no confidence in the inter-party government of Fine Gael, Labour and Clann na Talmhan. The Dáil had been scheduled to resume on 13 February. Rather than face defeat in the vote, on 4 February the Taoiseach John A. Costello, sought a dissolution of the Dáil for 12 February. The campaign was fought largely over economic issues and the situation in Northern Ireland. In the North, the IRA had launched Operation Harvest which drew much popular support in the south. Sinn Féin had been re-built and re-organized as a party by Paddy McLogan and was fielding abstentionist candidates.

Fianna Fáil had produced a major policy document in January, criticising many of its own policies in regard to the economy. While they did not know an election was imminent this became the backbone of their manifesto. The importance of free trade was played up by Fianna Fáil in a clear rejection of the protectionist policies they had advocated in the past. The architect of many of these new policies was the spokesperson for Industry and Commerce and the heir-apparent of the party, Seán Lemass. At 75 years of age Éamon de Valera was fighting his last general election as leader of the party. In spite of his age, he carried out a vigorous campaign, often being accompanied by brass bands and torch-lit processions. The Fianna Fáil message was simple: coalition governments were unstable.

The other parties, most of them having enjoyed a stint in government over the previous three years, fought the election on their record in office, Fine Gael in particular. Clann na Talmhan failed to broaden their appeal and remained the voice of the farmers. Clann na Poblachta under Seán MacBride had agreed not to stand in constituencies where Sinn Féin were fielding candidates and lost two of its three seats. Sinn Féin, fighting one of its first post-war elections on an abstentionist ticket won 4 seats.

== Result ==
Election to the 16th Dáil – 5 March 1957
Party	Leader	Seats	±	% of seats	First pref. votes	% FPv	±%
Fianna Fáil	Éamon de Valera	78	+13	53.1	592,994	48.3	+4.9
Fine Gael	Richard Mulcahy	40	–10	27.2	326,699	26.6	–5.4
Labour	William Norton	12	–7	8.2	111,747	9.1	–3.0
Sinn Féin	Paddy McLogan	4	+4	2.7	65,640	5.3	+5.2
Clann na Talmhan	Joseph Blowick	3	–2	2.0	28,905	2.4	–1.4
Clann na Poblachta	Seán MacBride (Note: After the election, while Seán MacBride remained leader of Clann na Poblachta, John Tully was the sole member of the parliamentary party.)	1	–2	0.7	20,632	1.7	–1.4
Irish Housewives' Association		0	New	0	4,797	0.4	–
Ratepayers' Association		0	New	0	3,113	0.3	–
Independent	N/A	9	+4	6.1	72,492	5.9	+0.6
Spoilt votes					11,540	—N/a	—N/a
Total		147	0	100	1,238,559	100	—N/a
Electorate/Turnout					1,738,278	71.3	—N/a

=== Voting summary ===
First preference vote
Fianna Fáil	48.34%
Fine Gael	26.63%
Labour	9.11%
Sinn Féin	5.35%
Clann na Talmhan	2.36%
Clann na Poblachta	1.68%
Others	0.64%
Independent	5.91%

=== Seats summary ===
Dáil seats
Fianna Fáil	53.06%
Fine Gael	27.21%
Labour	8.16%
Sinn Féin	2.72%
Clann na Talmhan	2.04%
Clann na Poblachta	0.68%
Independent	6.12%

== Government formation ==
A Fianna Fáil majority government was formed. Éamon de Valera became Taoiseach for the last time.

== Change in membership ==
=== First time TDs ===
- Kevin Boland (Appointed Minister for Defence on his first day in the Dáil)
- Lionel Booth
- Seán Browne
- Batt Donegan
- Paddy Clohessy
- Patrick Dooley
- Pádraig Faulkner
- Jim Gibbons
- Charles Haughey
- Gus Healy
- Brigid Hogan
- John Joe McGirl
- Jack Murphy
- Ruairí Ó Brádaigh
- Eighneachán Ó hAnnluain
- James O'Toole
- John Joe Rice
- Patrick Tierney

=== Re-elected TDs ===
- Frank Loughman

=== Retiring TDs ===
- Peadar Doyle
- Brendan Glynn

=== Outgoing TDs ===
- Patrick Crowe
- Seán Collins
- James Hession
- Edward Kelly
- Joseph Roddy

== Seanad election ==
The Dáil election was followed by an election to the 9th Seanad.
