= 1938 Irish general election =

Election to the 10th Dáil

- 17 June 1938

138 seats in Dáil Éireann (Note: Including Frank Fahy, returned automatically for Galway East as outgoing Ceann Comhairle, under Art. 16.6 of the Constitution and the Electoral (Chairman of Dáil Éireann) Act 1937.) 70 seats needed for a majority
- Turnout: 76.7% ▲0.5 pp
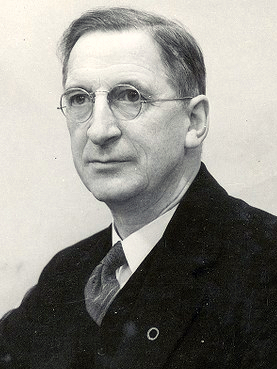

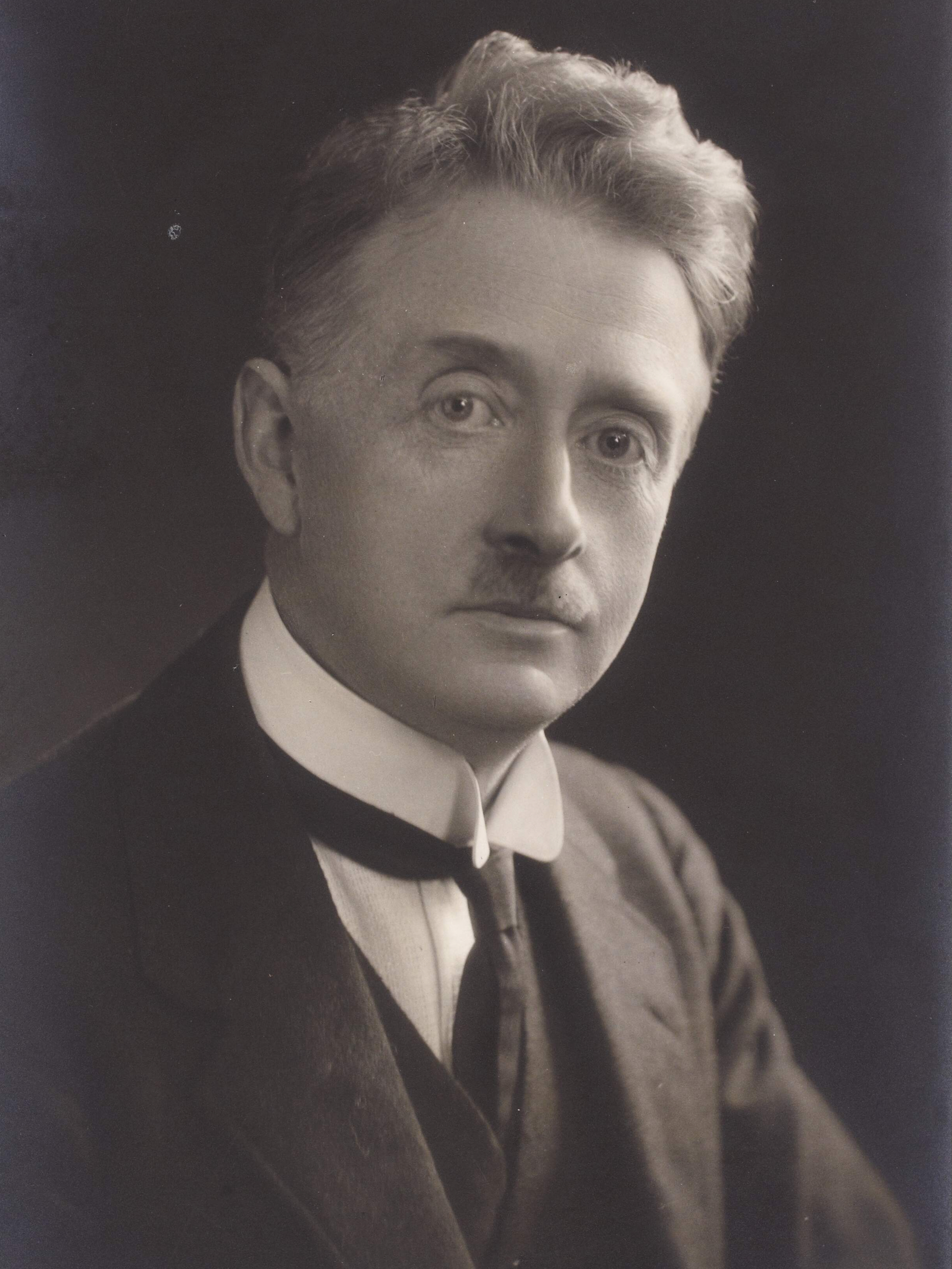

	First party	Second party	Third party
Leader	Éamon de Valera	W. T. Cosgrave	William Norton
Party	Fianna Fáil	Fine Gael	Labour
Leader since	26 March 1926	September 1934	19 July 1932
Leader's seat	Clare	Cork Borough	Carlow–Kildare
Last election	69 seats, 45.2%	48 seats, 34.8%	13 seats, 10.3%
Seats won	77	45	9
Seat change	▲8	▼3	▼4
Popular vote	667,996	428,633	128,945
Percentage	51.9%	33.3%	10.0%
Swing	▲6.7 pp	▼1.5 pp	▼0.3 pp
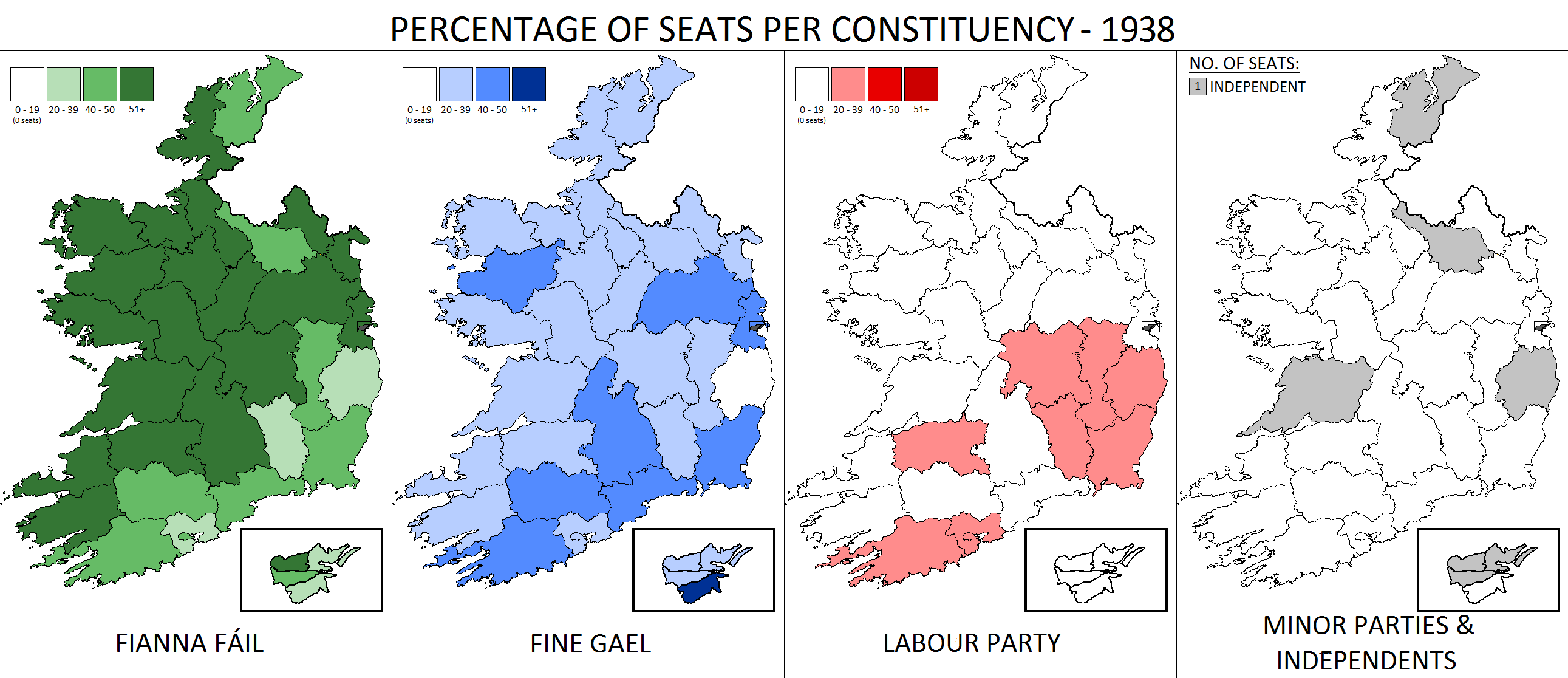
Taoiseach before election
Éamon de Valera
Fianna Fáil
Taoiseach after election
Éamon de Valera
Fianna Fáil

The 1938 Irish general election to the 10th Dáil was held on Friday, 17 June following the dissolution of the 9th Dáil on 27 May 1938 by the Presidential Commission on the request of Taoiseach Éamon de Valera. This snap election was held less than a year after the previous election, caused by the government's loss of an opposition motion recommending use of arbitration to resolve Civil Service labour disputes. The general election took place in 34 parliamentary constituencies throughout Ireland for 138 seats in Dáil Éireann. It was the first election held after the coming into force of the Constitution of Ireland on 29 December 1937.

Fianna Fáil won, achieving the first majority in the history of the State.

The 10th Dáil met at Leinster House on 30 June to nominate the Taoiseach for appointment by President Douglas Hyde and to approve the appointment of a new government of Ireland on the nomination of the Taoiseach. Outgoing Taoiseach Éamon de Valera was re-appointed leading a single-party Fianna Fáil government.

== Result ==
Election to the 10th Dáil – 17 June 1938
Party	Leader	Seats	±	% of seats	First pref. votes	% FPv	±%
Fianna Fáil	Éamon de Valera	77	+8	55.8	667,996	51.9	+6.7
Fine Gael	W. T. Cosgrave	45	–3	32.6	428,633	33.3	–1.5
Labour	William Norton	9	–4	6.5	128,945	10.0	–0.3
Independent	N/A	7	–1	5.1	60,685	4.7	–5.0
Spoilt votes					15,811	—N/a	—N/a
Total		138	0	100	1,302,070	100	—N/a
Electorate/Turnout					1,770,422	76.7	—N/a

=== Voting summary ===
First preference vote
Fianna Fáil	51.93%
Fine Gael	33.32%
Labour	10.02%
Independent	4.72%

=== Seats summary ===
Dáil seats
Fianna Fáil	55.80%
Fine Gael	32.61%
Labour	6.52%
Independent	5.07%

== Government formation ==
Fianna Fáil formed a majority government, the 2nd government of Ireland.

== Changes in membership ==
=== First time TDs ===
- Erskine H. Childers
- Daniel Hogan
- James Hughes
- Frank Loughman
- Henry McDevitt
- Thomas Mullen
- Peter O'Loghlen
- Mícheál Ó Móráin

=== Re-elected TDs ===
- William Broderick
- Eamonn Cooney
- Richard Mulcahy
- James Reidy

=== Outgoing TDs ===
- Archie Heron (Lost seat)
- Gerrard McGowan (Retired)
- Edward Moane (Lost seat)
- Sydney Minch (Lost seat)
- Daniel O'Leary (Lost seat)

== Seanad election ==
The election was followed by an election to the 3rd Seanad.
