= 1944 Irish general election =

Election to the 12th Dáil

- 30 May 1944

138 seats in Dáil Éireann (Note: Including Frank Fahy (FF), returned automatically for Galway East as outgoing Ceann Comhairle, under Art. 16.6 of the Constitution and the Electoral (Chairman of Dáil Éireann) Act 1937.) 70 seats needed for a majority
- Turnout: 69.2% ▼5.0 pp
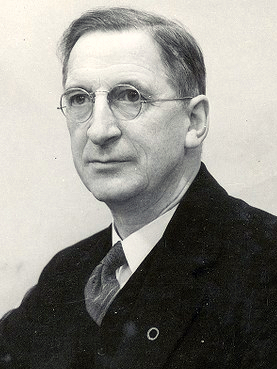

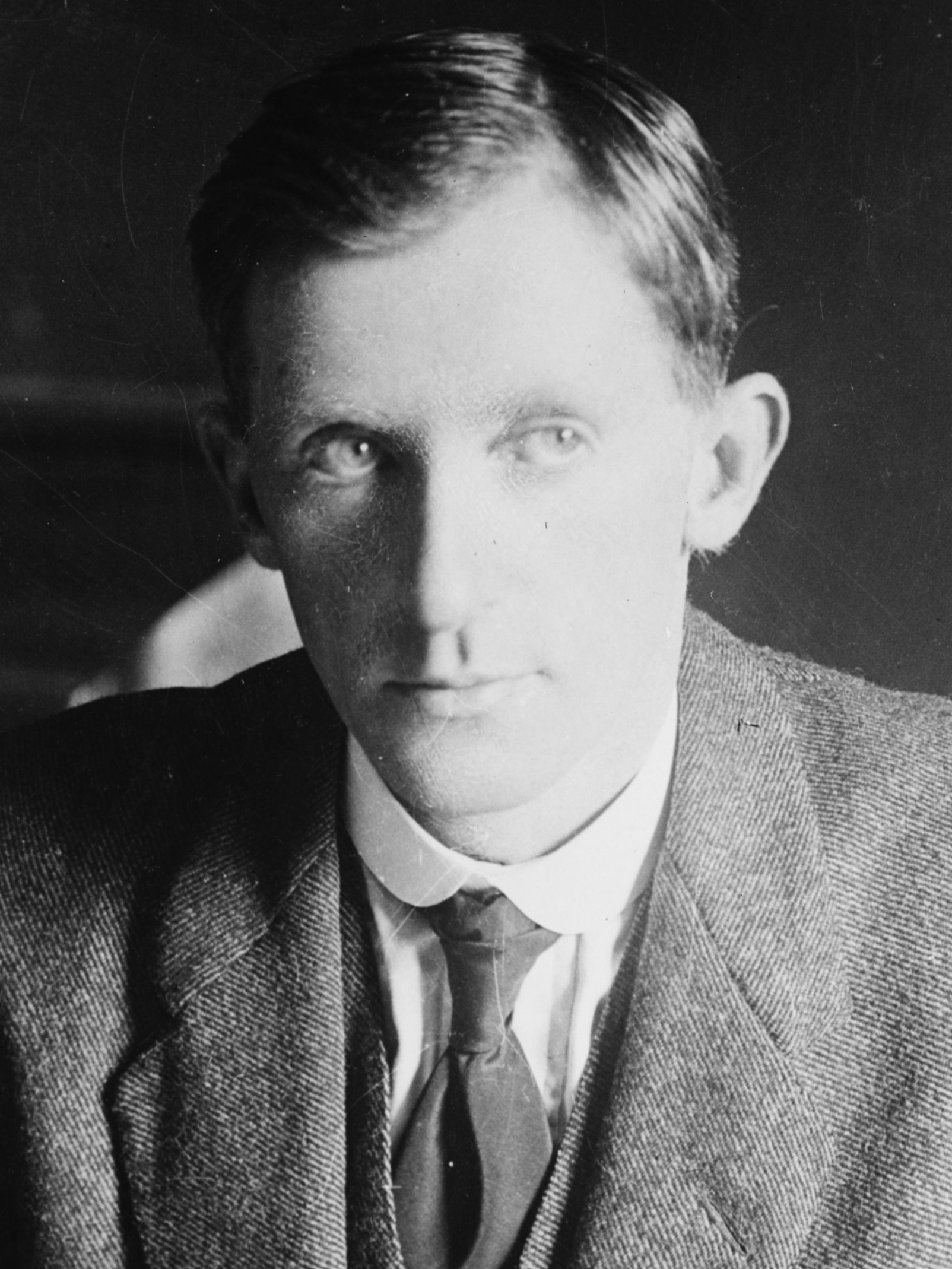

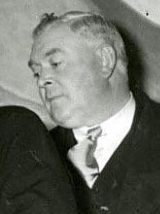

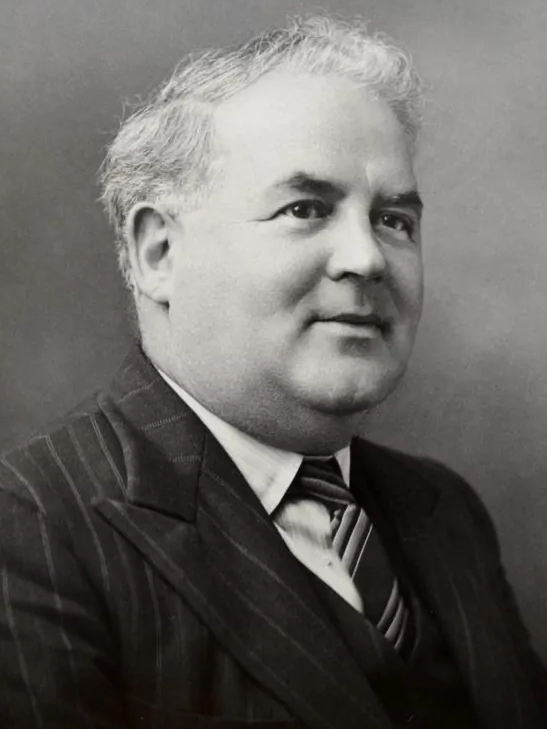

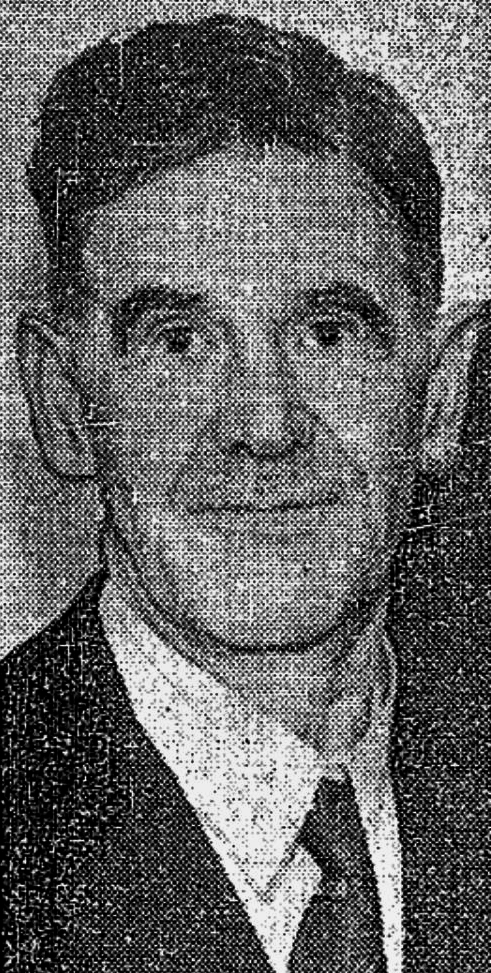
	First party	Second party	Third party
Leader	Éamon de Valera	Richard Mulcahy	Joseph Blowick
Party	Fianna Fáil	Fine Gael	Clann na Talmhan
Leader since	26 March 1926	1944	1944
Leader's seat	Clare	Tipperary	Mayo South
Last election	67 seats, 41.9%	32 seats, 23.1%	10 seats, 9.0%
Seats won	76	30	9
Seat change	▲9	▼2	▼1
Popular vote	595,259	249,329	122,745
Percentage	48.9%	20.5%	10.8%
Swing	▲7.0 pp	▼2.6 pp	▲1.8 pp
	Fourth party	Fifth party
Leader	William Norton	James Everett
Party	Labour	National Labour Party
Leader since	1932	1944
Leader's seat	Carlow–Kildare	Wicklow
Last election	17 seats, 15.7%	New party
Seats won	8	4
Seat change	▼9	New
Popular vote	106,767	32,732
Percentage	8.7%	2.7%
Swing	▼7.0 pp	New party
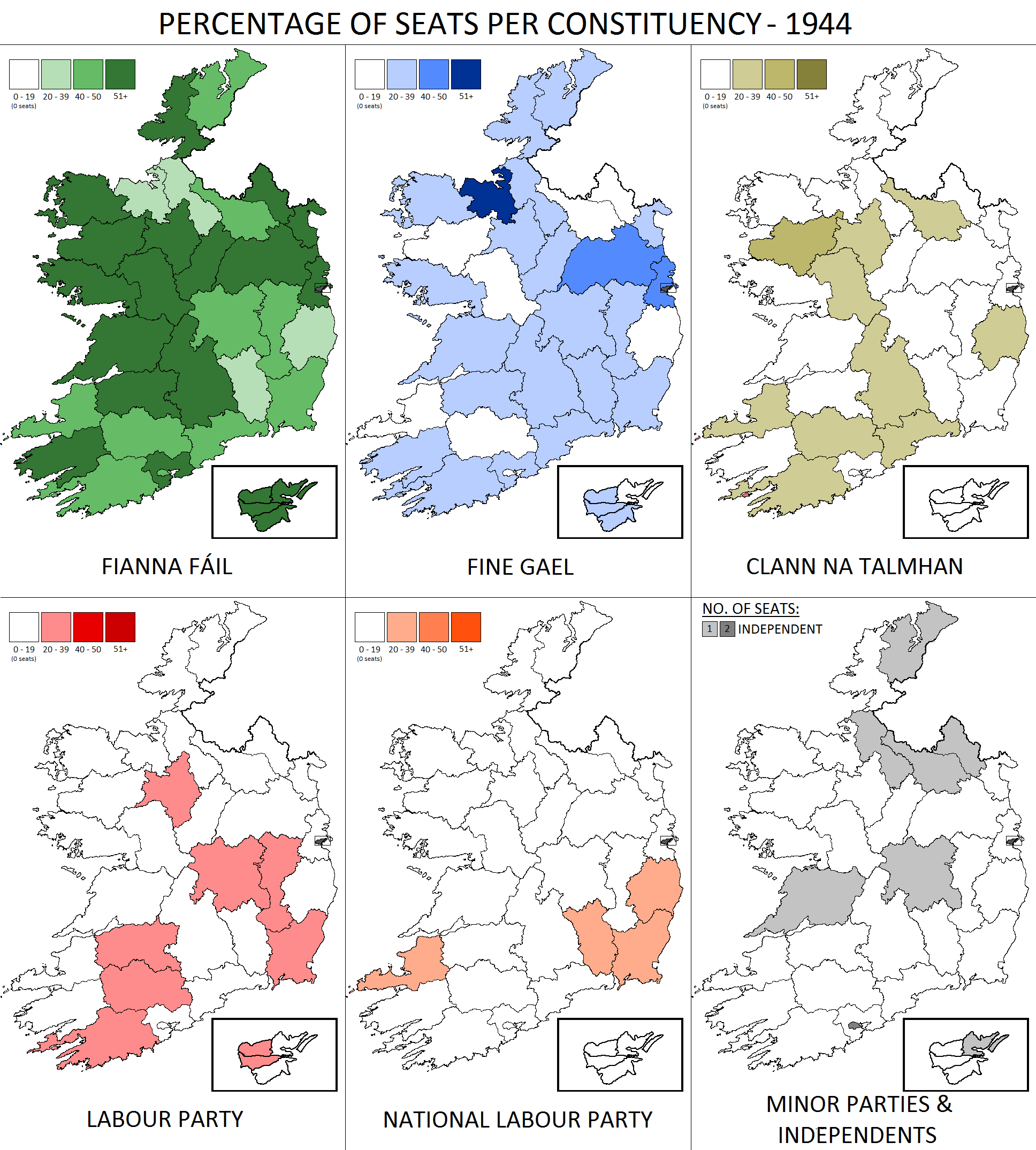
Taoiseach before election
Éamon de Valera
Fianna Fáil
Taoiseach after election
Éamon de Valera
Fianna Fáil

The 1944 Irish general election to the 12th Dáil was held on Tuesday, 30 May, having been called on 10 May by President Douglas Hyde on the advice of Taoiseach Éamon de Valera. The general election took place in 34 parliamentary constituencies for 138 seats in Dáil Éireann, the house of representatives of the Oireachtas. Fianna Fáil won an overall majority. The outgoing 11th Dáil was dissolved on 7 June.

The 12th Dáil met at Leinster House on 9 June to nominate the Taoiseach for appointment by the president and to approve the appointment of a new government of Ireland on the nomination of the Taoiseach. Outgoing Taoiseach Éamon de Valera was re-appointed leading a single-party Fianna Fáil government.

== Calling the election ==
The outgoing Fianna Fáil government, formed on 1 July 1943, was a minority government. On 9 May 1944, it suffered a defeat in a vote to delay the second reading of its Transport Bill. Taoiseach Éamon de Valera sought a snap election, just one year after the previous election, in hopes of getting an overall majority.

It was the second election called under the General Elections (Emergency Provisions) Act 1943. The Act, intended to increase national security by minimising the interval during which no Dáil is in existence, subvented the requirement under the Constitution for the president to dissolve the Dáil before a general election took place, and was permitted under the state of emergency in effect during the Second World War.

The election was called in the early hours of 10 May but the Dáil met as scheduled that day, when an adjournment debate was held in which the opposition TDs condemned the decision to hold an election in wartime as unnecessary and reckless. The 11th Dáil was dissolved on 7 June 1944. The nature of the visit to the president to obtain the election was also criticised, with opposition figures noting that the President could have refused to proclaim a general election and might've done in different circumstances.

We find the Taoiseach arriving in the darkness of the night in the house of an aged man whom everyone knows to be in anything but a perfect state of health. One can imagine the scene — the Taoiseach full of venom against a democratic Parliament which had unseated his Government. One is left to imagine the tone in which the demand for a dissolution was presented to the aged man in the Park last night. Like Deputy O'Higgins I want to express sympathy with the President in the advantage which was taken of him last night and of the nocturnal intrusion of an annoyed and outraged Taoiseach. — William Norton TD.

President Hyde called the election as per De Valera's, with the proclamation signed in the early hours of 10 May.

== Campaign ==
The campaign was not wanted by the opposition parties. Fianna Fáil fought the election on its record in government and also in the hope of securing a fresh mandate for its policies. During the campaign Fine Gael put forward the proposal of forming a coalition government with the Labour Party and Clann na Talmhan; however, this was ridiculed by Fianna Fáil as untenable. National Labour had split from Labour in January 1944.

Due to the fractured nature of the opposition, Éamon de Valera's tactic of calling a snap general election succeeded, with Fianna Fáil increasing its share of seats, as it had in the previous snap elections of 1933 and 1938.

== Result ==
Election to the 12th Dáil – 30 May 1944
Party	Leader	Seats	±	% of seats	First pref. votes	% FPv	±%
Fianna Fáil	Éamon de Valera	76	+9	55.1	595,259	48.9	+7.0
Fine Gael	Richard Mulcahy	30	–2	21.8	249,329	20.5	–2.6
Clann na Talmhan	Joseph Blowick	9	–1	6.5	122,745	10.1	+0.3
Labour	William Norton	8	–9	5.8	106,767	8.8	–6.9
National Labour Party	James Everett	4	New	2.9	32,732	2.7	–
Monetary Reform	Oliver J. Flanagan	1	0	0.7	9,856	0.8	+0.5
Ailtirí na hAiséirghe		0	0	0	5,809	0.5	+0.3
Independent	N/A	10	0	7.2	94,852	7.8	–0.9
Spoilt votes					12,790	—N/a	—N/a
Total		138	0	100	1,230,139	100	—N/a
Electorate/Turnout					1,816,142	69.2	—N/a

=== Voting summary ===
First preference vote
Fianna Fáil	48.9%
Fine Gael	20.5%
Clann na Talmhan	10.1%
Labour	8.8%
National Labour	2.7%
Monetary Reform	0.8%
Ailtirí na hAiséirghe	0.5%
Independent	7.8%

=== Seats summary ===
Dáil seats
Fianna Fáil	55.1%
Fine Gael	21.8%
Clann na Talmhan	6.5%
Labour	5.8%
National Labour	2.9%
Monetary Reform	0.7%
Independent	7.2%

== Government formation ==
Fianna Fáil formed the 4th government of Ireland, a majority government.

== Changes in membership ==
=== First-time TDs ===
- Thomas Brennan
- Harry Colley
- Eamonn Coogan
- Walter Furlong
- Michael Lydon
- Patrick McAuliffe
- John S. O'Connor
- Mary Ryan

=== Re-elected TDs ===
- John A. Costello
- Frank Loughman
- Peter O'Loghlen
- Eamonn O'Neill
- Laurence Walsh
- Richard Walsh (regained seat)

=== Outgoing TDs ===
- Ernest Benson
- Sir John Esmonde, Bt
- James Larkin
- Timothy Linehan
- Richard Stapleton

=== Retiring TDs ===
- Jeremiah Ryan
- W. T. Cosgrave

== Seanad election ==
The election was followed by an election to the 5th Seanad.

== Sources ==
- Manning, Maurice (1972). Irish Political Parties: An Introduction. Dublin: Gill & Macmillan. ISBN 978-0-7171-0536-6.
