= Joseph Blowick =

Irish politician (1903–1970)

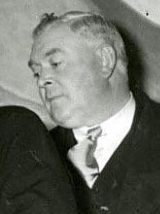
- Blowick in 1950

Minister for Lands
- In office 2 June 1954 – 20 March 1957
- Taoiseach: John A. Costello
- Preceded by: Thomas Derrig
- Succeeded by: Erskine Childers
- In office 18 February 1948 – 7 March 1951
- Taoiseach: John A. Costello
- Preceded by: Seán Moylan
- Succeeded by: Thomas Derrig

Leader of Clann na Talmhan
- In office 5 September 1944 – 18 March 1965
- Preceded by: Michael Donnellan
- Succeeded by: Office abolished

Teachta Dála
- In office June 1943 – April 1965
- Constituency: Mayo South

Personal details
- Born: 13 March 1903 Belcarra, County Mayo, Ireland
- Died: 12 August 1970 (aged 67) Dublin, Ireland
- Party: Clann na Talmhan
- Spouse: Teresa O'Malley (m. 1956)
- Children: 7

Joseph Blowick (13 March 1903 – 12 August 1970) was an Irish Clann na Talmhan politician who served as Minister for Lands from 1948 to 1951 and 1954 to 1957 and Leader of Clann na Talmhan from 1944 to 1965. He served as a Teachta Dála (TD) for the Mayo South constituency from 1943 to 1965.

== Family ==
Blowick was born in Belcarra, County Mayo, on 13 March 1903, the son of John Blowick (a farmer) and Honoria "Norah" (née Madden) Blowick. He had two sisters, and four brothers, three of whom became priests: Stephen Blowick, John Blowick and Peter Blowick.

He attended the local national school and later worked on his father's large farm, going on to inherit it, as his other brothers were all in Holy orders.

In January 1956, aged 53, Blowick married nineteen-year-old Teresa O'Malley of Castleburke, County Mayo. They had four sons and three daughters.

== Political career ==
Blowock's first political office was as a member of Mayo County Council.

He was first elected to Dáil Éireann in 1943 as a Clann na Talmhan TD for Mayo South, one of ten seats the party took across the state and one of the two seats in County Mayo. He succeeded Michael Donnellan as leader of the party in 1944.

The party's representation dropped to seven seats after the 1948 general election but it was strong enough to be part of a coalition arrangement and Blowick was appointed to the Cabinet in the two Inter-Party governments (1948–1951, 1954–1957), serving under John A. Costello as Minister for Lands on both occasions.

Blowick was re-elected to the Dáil at every election until 1965 when he retired from politics.

He died on 12 August 1970 in a Dublin hospital, leaving an estate valued at £9,771.

Party political offices
| Preceded by Michael Donnellan | Leader of Clann na Talmhan; 1944–1965 | Succeeded by Party disbanded |
Political offices
| Preceded by Seán Moylan | Minister for Lands; 1948–1951 | Succeeded by Thomas Derrig |
| Preceded by Thomas Derrig | Minister for Lands; 1954–1957 | Succeeded by Erskine H. Childers |

| Dáil | Election | Deputy (Party) | Deputy (Party) | Deputy (Party) | Deputy (Party) | Deputy (Party) |
|---|---|---|---|---|---|---|
| 4th | 1923 | Tom Maguire (Rep) | Michael Kilroy (Rep) | William Sears (CnaG) | Joseph MacBride (CnaG) | Martin Nally (CnaG) |
| 5th | 1927 (Jun) | Thomas J. O'Connell (Lab) | Michael Kilroy (FF) | Eugene Mullen (FF) | James FitzGerald-Kenney (CnaG) | Martin Nally (CnaG) |
| 6th | 1927 (Sep) | Thomas J. O'Connell (Lab) | Michael Kilroy (FF) | Richard Walsh (FF) | James FitzGerald-Kenney (CnaG) | Martin Nally (CnaG) |
| 7th | 1932 | Edward Moane (FF) | Michael Kilroy (FF) | Richard Walsh (FF) | James FitzGerald-Kenney (CnaG) | Martin Nally (CnaG) |
| 8th | 1933 | Edward Moane (FF) | Michael Kilroy (FF) | Richard Walsh (FF) | James FitzGerald-Kenney (CnaG) | Martin Nally (CnaG) |
| 9th | 1937 | Edward Moane (FF) | Micheál Clery (FF) | Richard Walsh (FF) | James FitzGerald-Kenney (FG) | Martin Nally (FG) |
| 10th | 1938 | Mícheál Ó Móráin (FF) | Micheál Clery (FF) | Richard Walsh (FF) | James FitzGerald-Kenney (FG) | Martin Nally (FG) |
| 11th | 1943 | Mícheál Ó Móráin (FF) | Micheál Clery (FF) | Joseph Blowick (CnaT) | James FitzGerald-Kenney (FG) | Dominick Cafferky (CnaT) |
| 12th | 1944 | Mícheál Ó Móráin (FF) | Micheál Clery (FF) | Joseph Blowick (CnaT) | Richard Walsh (FF) | Dominick Cafferky (CnaT) |
| 12th | 1945 by-election | Mícheál Ó Móráin (FF) | Bernard Commons (CnaT) | Joseph Blowick (CnaT) | Richard Walsh (FF) | Dominick Cafferky (CnaT) |
| 13th | 1948 | Mícheál Ó Móráin (FF) | Bernard Commons (CnaT) | Joseph Blowick (CnaT) | Richard Walsh (FF) | 4 seats 1948–1969 |
| 14th | 1951 | Mícheál Ó Móráin (FF) | Seán Flanagan (FF) | Joseph Blowick (CnaT) | Dominick Cafferky (CnaT) | 4 seats 1948–1969 |
| 15th | 1954 | Mícheál Ó Móráin (FF) | Seán Flanagan (FF) | Joseph Blowick (CnaT) | Henry Kenny (FG) | 4 seats 1948–1969 |
| 16th | 1957 | Mícheál Ó Móráin (FF) | Seán Flanagan (FF) | Joseph Blowick (CnaT) | Henry Kenny (FG) | 4 seats 1948–1969 |
| 17th | 1961 | Mícheál Ó Móráin (FF) | Seán Flanagan (FF) | Joseph Blowick (CnaT) | Henry Kenny (FG) | 4 seats 1948–1969 |
| 18th | 1965 | Mícheál Ó Móráin (FF) | Seán Flanagan (FF) | Michael Lyons (FG) | Henry Kenny (FG) | 4 seats 1948–1969 |
| 19th | 1969 | Constituency abolished. See Mayo East and Mayo West | | | | |
