= Clann na Talmhan =

- Founder and leader: Michael Donnellan (1939–1944)
- Leader: Joseph Blowick (1944–1965)
- Founded: 1939
- Dissolved: 1965
- Ideology: Agrarianism; Social democracy Populism
- Political position: Centre-left

Clann na Talmhan (pronounced [ˈklˠaːn̪ˠ n̪ˠə ˈt̪ˠalˠuːnˠ], "Family/Children of the land"; formally known as the National Agricultural Party) was an Irish agrarian political party active between 1939 and 1965.

== Formation and growth ==
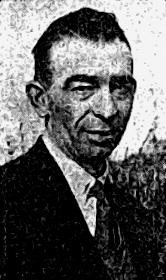
Founder Michael Donnellan

Clann na Talmhan was founded on 29 June 1939 in Athenry, County Galway, in the wake of the breakdown of unification talks between the Irish Farmers Federation (IFF) and representatives of farmers in Connacht on the issue of local property taxation. While the IFF supported full derating, the western view was that the largest farmers should not be relieved of all their rate-paying obligations. Were this to happen, the western opinion was that indirect taxation would inevitably increase, and that small farmers and workers would find themselves appreciably worse off.

The party was led initially by Galway farmer Michael Donnellan. Its foundation represented a revival of agrarian politics in Ireland; from 1922 to 1933 a series of parties had represented farming interests, namely the Farmers' Party and the National Centre Party. However, these groups mostly attracted large farmers in the east. In contrast, Clann na Talmhan appealed explicitly to the more numerous small farmers of the west of Ireland. The party's objectives included the promotion of the interests of small farmers, government support for land reclamation, lowering of taxes on farmland, a more progressive system of land rates that would help small farmers, and more intensive afforestation. During the 1940s it began to adopt social democratic policies. It supported free secondary education and subsidised university education, as well as state investment in a public healthcare system. The party also had a distinct populist streak, pushing back against establishment politicians, bankers, and the wealthy in Irish society. In 1942, at a rally in Dunmore, County Galway Michael Donnellan declared "You could take all the TDs, all the senators, all the ministers and members of the judiciary and all the other nice fellows and dump them off Clare Island into the broad Atlantic. Still, Ireland would succeed. But without the workers and producers, the country would starve in twenty-four hours".

In contrast to the earlier Farmers' Party, Clann na Talmhan emphasised grass-roots campaigning and political agitation. It also developed an efficient electoral machine, largely owing to the advice and skills it gained from former members of Fianna Fáil. Although the party was hindered to a degree by wartime restrictions on public meetings and the press, it did have five years to prepare for its first election.

In 1943, Clann na Talmhan merged with the National Agricultural Party, a rival political party set up in Leinster to represent the large farmers there, believing that the merger was needed in order to contest the upcoming 1943 general election. The unified party won ten seats in that election and nine at the 1944 general election. However, the merger of the two groups brought a great deal of instability, as infighting between the small farmers from Connacht and the large farmers from Leinster divided the party members. In light of this, Donnellan resigned as leader following the election and was replaced by Joseph Blowick, a large farmer from County Mayo.

== In government and decline ==
The party was one of five parties in the first inter-party government (1948–1951), with Blowick serving as Minister for Lands and Donnellan becoming a Parliamentary Secretary to the Minister for Finance. Clann na Talmhan was one of three parties in the second inter-party government (1954–1957), with Blowick and Donnellan reprising their ministerial roles. However, this period saw a retrenchment rather than expansion of the party, which did not expand its support beyond western and southern small farmers. Like its spiritual predecessors, Clann na Talmhan could not unite small and large farmers in one party, and this restricted its electoral appeal.

The party began to lose its position after its spells in government. A lack of improvement in the economy during this period led to disillusionment with Clann na Talmhan, and people again began to vote for Fianna Fáil and Fine Gael rather than small parties. During the 1950s many activists had departed, and the party became little more than a collection of personal electoral machines. By 1961, Donnellan and Blowick were the only party TDs remaining, and the party ceased to exist as an organisation independent of those men. When Donnellan died in 1964 his son John Donnellan was elected in his place, but for Fine Gael rather than his father's party. Blowick decided not to contest the 1965 general election, and Clann na Talmhan was formally wound up.

== General election results ==
| Election | Seats won | ± | Position | First Pref votes | % | Government | Leader |
|---|---|---|---|---|---|---|---|
| 1943 | 10 / 138 | ▲10 | ▲4th | 130,452 | 9.8% | Opposition | Michael Donnellan |
| 1944 | 9 / 138 | ▼1 | ▲3rd | 122,745 | 10.1% | Opposition | Joseph Blowick |
| 1948 | 7 / 147 | ▼2 | ▼5th | 73,813 | 5.6% | Coalition (FG-LP-CnP-CnT-NLP) | Joseph Blowick |
| 1951 | 6 / 147 | ▼1 | ▲4th | 38,872 | 2.9% | Opposition | Joseph Blowick |
| 1954 | 5 / 147 | ▼1 | 4th | 51,069 | 3.8% | Coalition (FG-LP-CnT) | Joseph Blowick |
| 1957 | 3 / 147 | ▼2 | ▼5th | 28,905 | 2.4% | Opposition | Joseph Blowick |
| 1961 | 2 / 144 | ▼1 | ▲4th | 17,693 | 1.5% | Opposition | Joseph Blowick |

== See also ==
- Farmers' Party (Ireland)
- Category:Clann na Talmhan politicians

== Sources ==
- Maurice Fitzgerald, 2000. "Ireland's European Integration, 1957 to 1966" in Protectionism to Liberalization: Ireland and the EEC, 1957 to 1966. Aldershot, UK: Ashgate. Open Access Copy
- Barberis, Peter, John McHugh and Mike Tyldesley, 2005. Encyclopedia of British and Irish Political Organisations. London: Continuum International Publishing Group. ISBN 0-8264-5814-9, ISBN 978-0-8264-5814-8
- Manning, Maurice, 1972. Irish Political Parties: An Introduction. Dublin: Gill and Macmillan. ISBN 978-0-7171-0536-6
