= John Curtin (disambiguation) =

John Curtin (1885–1945) was an Australian prime minister.

John Curtin may also refer to:

- John I. Curtin (1837–1911), American Civil War general
- John Curtin (American politician) (1865–1925), California state senator
- John Thomas Curtin (1921–2017), U.S. federal judge
- John Curtin (footballer) (1924–2019), Australian rules footballer for St Kilda

== See also ==
- John Curtin College of the Arts, high school in Fremantle, Western Australia
- John Curtin School of Medical Research, part of Australian National University
- John McCurtin (1896–1982), Irish Cumann na nGaedheal TD and prisoner
