= 1947 Tipperary by-election =

By-election to the 12th Dáil

- 29 October 1947
- Turnout: 53,510 (66.0%)
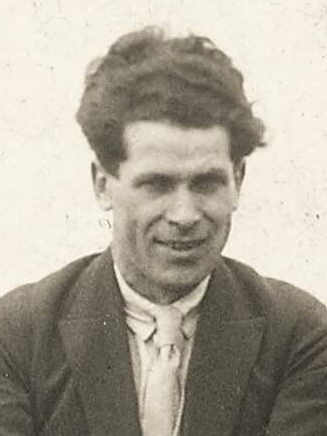
	Kinane		Ryan
Nominee	Patrick Kinane	Seán Hayes	Jeremiah Ryan
Party	Clann na Poblachta	Fianna Fáil	Fine Gael
First preferences	11,471	17,169	11,341
Percentage	21.4%	32.1%	21.2%
Final count	23,265	21,647	–
TD before election
William O'Donnell
Clann na Talmhan
TD after election
Patrick Kinane
Clann na Poblachta

A Dáil by-election was held in the constituency of Tipperary in Ireland on Wednesday, 29 October 1947, to fill a vacancy in the 12th Dáil. It followed the death of Clann na Talmhan Teachta Dála (TD) William O'Donnell on 4 February 1947.

In 1947, Tipperary was a seven seat constituency comprising the counties of North Tipperary and South Tipperary.

The writ of election to fill the vacancy was agreed by the Dáil on 8 October 1947.

The by-election was won by the Clann na Poblachta candidate Patrick Kinane. It was held on the same day as the 1947 Dublin County by-election and the 1947 Waterford by-election.

Two by-elections were won by Clann na Poblachta, and one by Fianna Fáil. It was the first election victories for Clann na Poblachta, which was founded by Seán MacBride in 1946.

== Result ==
1947 Tipperary by-election
Party	Candidate	FPv%	Count			
Party	Candidate	FPv%	1	2	3	4
Fianna Fáil	Seán Hayes	32.1	17,169	18,156	19,868	21,647
Clann na Poblachta	Patrick Kinane	21.4	11,471	13,004	16,281	23,265
Fine Gael	Jeremiah Ryan	21.2	11,341	14,386	15,795	
Labour	Denis O'Sullivan	13.5	7,201	7,427		
Clann na Talmhan	Michael Fitzgerald	11.8	6,328			
Electorate: 81,112 Valid: 53,510 Quota: 26,756 Turnout: 66.0%
