= Jackie Cahill =

Irish former politician (born 1963

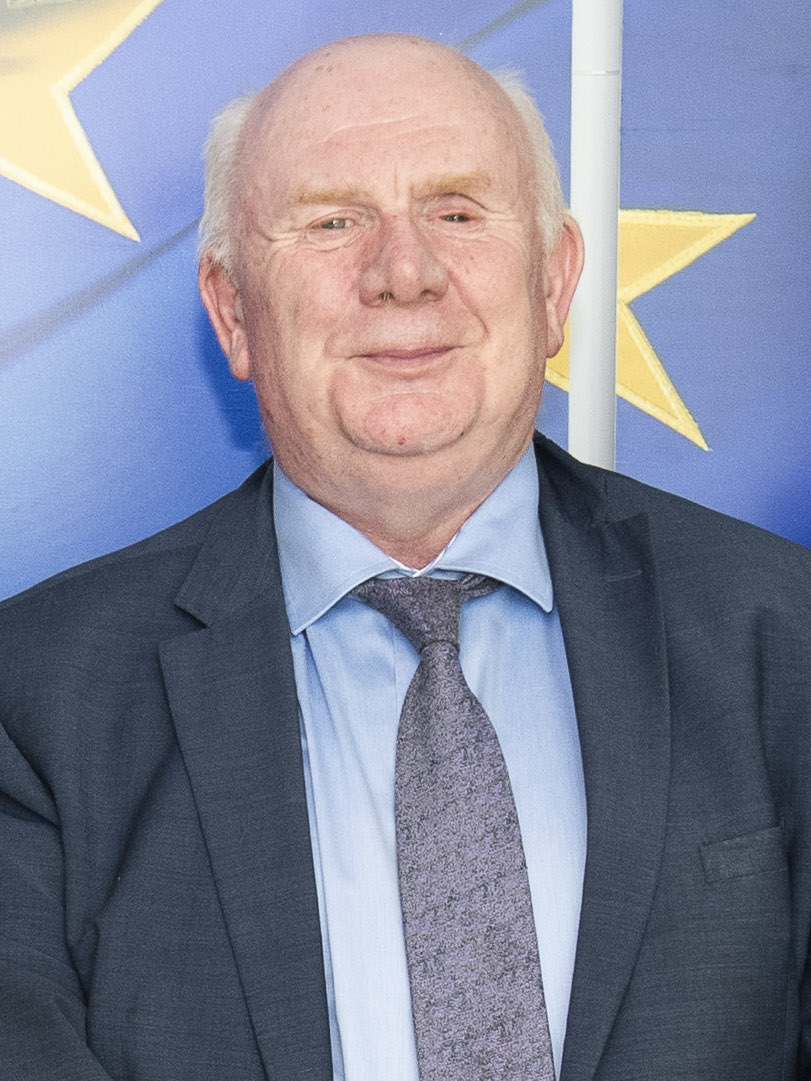
- Cahill in 2023

Teachta Dála
- In office February 2016 – November 2024
- Constituency: Tipperary

Tipperary County Councillor
- In office May 2014 – February 2016
- Constituency: Templemore–Thurles

Personal details
- Born: 5 August 1963 (age 62) Thurles, County Tipperary, Ireland
- Party: Fianna Fáil

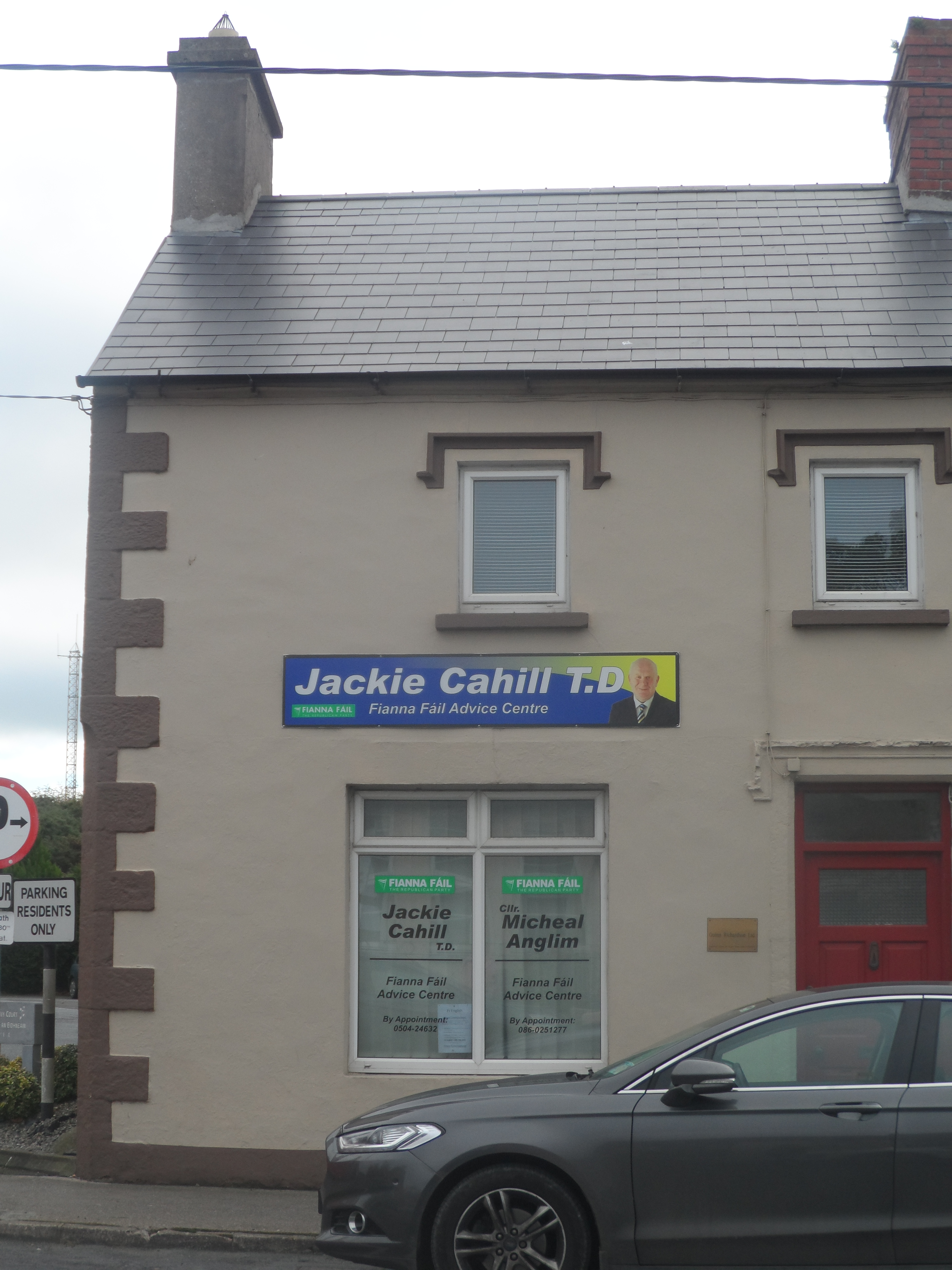
Cahill's former constituency office, Cahir

Jackie Cahill (born 5 August 1963) is an Irish former Fianna Fáil politician who served as a Teachta Dála (TD) for the Tipperary constituency from 2016 to 2024.

== Career ==
Cahill had been a member of Tipperary County Council from 2014 to 2016, when he was elected to Dáil Éireann. He is the former president of the Irish Creamery Milk Suppliers Association (ICMSA). He is also a former member of Bord Bia, the National Dairy Board, the National Dairy Council (of which he was chair) and the European Milk Board. He was also a board member of Thurles Greyhound Track and Centenary Thurles Co-operative Society. Cahill was chair of the Thurles Co-operative at the time of its merger with Centenary Co-operative.

Cahill became chair of the Oireachtas Agriculture Committee in the 33rd Dáil. In August 2020, Cahill expressed disappointment with not being appointed as Minister for Agriculture, stating that “I think I had a serious CV in agriculture.”

In his 2020 book, In Bed with the Blueshirts, former government minister Shane Ross criticised Cahill for working with fellow Tipperary deputies Alan Kelly, Mattie McGrath and Michael Lowry to lobby on behalf of vintners to defeat his bill to tighten drink driving limits.

In 2021, Cahill called for Glanbia to be granted planning permission for a cheese factory in Kilkenny, owning shares in the company at the time, according to the Oireachtas Register of Interests. In August 2021, the Irish Examiner included Cahill on a list of Fianna Fáil TDs who may rebel against party leader and Taoiseach, Micheál Martin. In 2022, he opposed reductions in the national livestock herd to meet emissions targets, saying that herd reduction was "not an option".

On 21 October 2024, Cahill announced that he would not contest the 2024 general election following health advice.

== Personal life ==
Cahill is from Thurles. In a 2020 interview with the Irish Independent, he stated that he lost an eye and claimed to have been reluctant in his initial involvement in farm politics.

Dáil	Election	Deputy (Party)	Deputy (Party)	Deputy (Party)	Deputy (Party)	Deputy (Party)	Deputy (Party)	Deputy (Party)
4th	1923	Dan Breen (Rep)	Séamus Burke (CnaG)	Louis Dalton (CnaG)	Daniel Morrissey (Lab)	Patrick Ryan (Rep)	Michael Heffernan (FP)	Seán McCurtin (CnaG)
5th	1927 (Jun)	Seán Hayes (FF)	Séamus Burke (CnaG)	John Hassett (CnaG)	Daniel Morrissey (Lab)	William O'Brien (Lab)	Michael Heffernan (FP)	Andrew Fogarty (FF)
6th	1927 (Sep)	Seán Hayes (FF)	Séamus Burke (CnaG)	John Hassett (CnaG)	Daniel Morrissey (Lab)	Timothy Sheehy (FF)	Michael Heffernan (FP)	Andrew Fogarty (FF)
7th	1932	Seán Hayes (FF)	Séamus Burke (CnaG)	John Hassett (CnaG)	Daniel Morrissey (Ind.)	Timothy Sheehy (FF)	Dan Breen (FF)	Andrew Fogarty (FF)
8th	1933	Seán Hayes (FF)	Séamus Burke (CnaG)	Richard Curran (NCP)	Daniel Morrissey (CnaG)	Martin Ryan (FF)	Dan Breen (FF)	Andrew Fogarty (FF)
9th	1937	William O'Brien (Lab)	Séamus Burke (FG)	Jeremiah Ryan (FG)	Daniel Morrissey (FG)	Martin Ryan (FF)	Dan Breen (FF)	Andrew Fogarty (FF)
10th	1938	Frank Loughman (FF)	Richard Curran (FG)	Jeremiah Ryan (FG)	Daniel Morrissey (FG)	Martin Ryan (FF)	Dan Breen (FF)	Andrew Fogarty (FF)
11th	1943	Richard Stapleton (Lab)	William O'Donnell (CnaT)	Jeremiah Ryan (FG)	Daniel Morrissey (FG)	Martin Ryan (FF)	Dan Breen (FF)	Andrew Fogarty (FF)
12th	1944	Frank Loughman (FF)	William O'Donnell (CnaT)	Richard Mulcahy (FG)	Daniel Morrissey (FG)	Mary Ryan (FF)	Dan Breen (FF)	Andrew Fogarty (FF)
12th	1947 by-election	Frank Loughman (FF)	Patrick Kinane (CnaP)	Richard Mulcahy (FG)	Daniel Morrissey (FG)	Mary Ryan (FF)	Dan Breen (FF)	Andrew Fogarty (FF)
13th	1948	Constituency abolished. See Tipperary North and Tipperary South						

Dáil	Election	Deputy (Party)	Deputy (Party)	Deputy (Party)	Deputy (Party)	Deputy (Party)
32nd	2016	Séamus Healy (WUA)	Alan Kelly (Lab)	Jackie Cahill (FF)	Michael Lowry (Ind.)	Mattie McGrath (Ind.)
33rd	2020	Martin Browne (SF)	Alan Kelly (Lab)	Jackie Cahill (FF)	Michael Lowry (Ind.)	Mattie McGrath (Ind.)
34th	2024	Constituency abolished. See Tipperary North and Tipperary South				
