= Richard Stapleton =

Irish politician (died 1949)

Teachta Dála
- In office June 1943 – May 1944
- Constituency: Tipperary

Personal details
- Born: County Tipperary, Ireland
- Died: 31 July 1949
- Party: Labour Party

Richard Stapleton (died 31 July 1949) was an Irish Labour Party politician. He was elected to Dáil Éireann as a Labour Party Teachta Dála (TD) for the Tipperary constituency at the 1943 general election. He lost his seat at the 1944 general election.

Dáil	Election	Deputy (Party)	Deputy (Party)	Deputy (Party)	Deputy (Party)	Deputy (Party)	Deputy (Party)	Deputy (Party)
4th	1923	Dan Breen (Rep)	Séamus Burke (CnaG)	Louis Dalton (CnaG)	Daniel Morrissey (Lab)	Patrick Ryan (Rep)	Michael Heffernan (FP)	Seán McCurtin (CnaG)
5th	1927 (Jun)	Seán Hayes (FF)	Séamus Burke (CnaG)	John Hassett (CnaG)	Daniel Morrissey (Lab)	William O'Brien (Lab)	Michael Heffernan (FP)	Andrew Fogarty (FF)
6th	1927 (Sep)	Seán Hayes (FF)	Séamus Burke (CnaG)	John Hassett (CnaG)	Daniel Morrissey (Lab)	Timothy Sheehy (FF)	Michael Heffernan (FP)	Andrew Fogarty (FF)
7th	1932	Seán Hayes (FF)	Séamus Burke (CnaG)	John Hassett (CnaG)	Daniel Morrissey (Ind.)	Timothy Sheehy (FF)	Dan Breen (FF)	Andrew Fogarty (FF)
8th	1933	Seán Hayes (FF)	Séamus Burke (CnaG)	Richard Curran (NCP)	Daniel Morrissey (CnaG)	Martin Ryan (FF)	Dan Breen (FF)	Andrew Fogarty (FF)
9th	1937	William O'Brien (Lab)	Séamus Burke (FG)	Jeremiah Ryan (FG)	Daniel Morrissey (FG)	Martin Ryan (FF)	Dan Breen (FF)	Andrew Fogarty (FF)
10th	1938	Frank Loughman (FF)	Richard Curran (FG)	Jeremiah Ryan (FG)	Daniel Morrissey (FG)	Martin Ryan (FF)	Dan Breen (FF)	Andrew Fogarty (FF)
11th	1943	Richard Stapleton (Lab)	William O'Donnell (CnaT)	Jeremiah Ryan (FG)	Daniel Morrissey (FG)	Martin Ryan (FF)	Dan Breen (FF)	Andrew Fogarty (FF)
12th	1944	Frank Loughman (FF)	William O'Donnell (CnaT)	Richard Mulcahy (FG)	Daniel Morrissey (FG)	Mary Ryan (FF)	Dan Breen (FF)	Andrew Fogarty (FF)
12th	1947 by-election	Frank Loughman (FF)	Patrick Kinane (CnaP)	Richard Mulcahy (FG)	Daniel Morrissey (FG)	Mary Ryan (FF)	Dan Breen (FF)	Andrew Fogarty (FF)
13th	1948	Constituency abolished. See Tipperary North and Tipperary South						

Dáil	Election	Deputy (Party)	Deputy (Party)	Deputy (Party)	Deputy (Party)	Deputy (Party)
32nd	2016	Séamus Healy (WUA)	Alan Kelly (Lab)	Jackie Cahill (FF)	Michael Lowry (Ind.)	Mattie McGrath (Ind.)
33rd	2020	Martin Browne (SF)	Alan Kelly (Lab)	Jackie Cahill (FF)	Michael Lowry (Ind.)	Mattie McGrath (Ind.)
34th	2024	Constituency abolished. See Tipperary North and Tipperary South				
