= Seán Hayes (Tipperary politician) =

Irish politician (1890–1968)

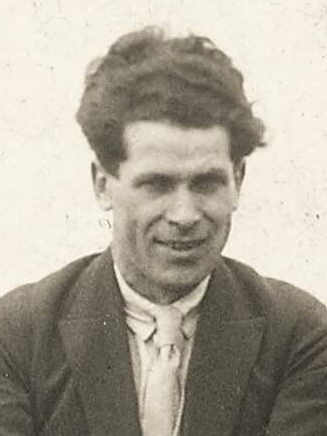
- Hayes in 1927

Senator
- In office 21 April 1948 – 23 June 1965
- In office 27 April 1938 – 8 September 1943
- Constituency: Labour Panel

Teachta Dála
- In office June 1927 – July 1937
- Constituency: Tipperary

Personal details
- Born: 1890 County Tipperary, Ireland
- Died: 4 January 1968 (aged 77–78) County Tipperary, Ireland
- Party: Fianna Fáil

Seán Hayes (1890 – 4 January 1968) was an Irish revolutionary and politician. He was a Fianna Fáil Teachta Dála (TD) for 10 years, and later a senator for 22 years.

== Revolutionary period ==
Hayes was a member of the Irish Volunteers from 1916. During the Irish War of Independence, he joined the South Tipperary Brigade Active Service Unit (ASU) in Summer 1920 under the command of Seán Treacy, Ernie O'Malley and Dan Breen. He took part in several ambushes of British forces and attacks on Royal Irish Constabulary barracks in counties Tipperary, Waterford and Kilkenny. During the Truce period, he was Battalion Commandant of 7 Battalion, South Tipperary Brigade, Irish Republican Army (IRA).

Taking the anti-Treaty side in the Irish Civil War, Hayes took part in fighting against the National Army during the Battle of Dublin in late June-early July 1922, and was promoted to Brigade Commandant of South Tipperary Brigade, IRA. He took part in several attacks and ambushes of National forces in counties Tipperary and Kilkenny and was with Liam Lynch when he was killed in April 1923. Hayes was not captured and remained on the run until the end of the war. He was later awarded a pension by the Irish government under the Military Service Pensions Act, 1934 for his service with the Irish Volunteers and the IRA between 1917 and 1923.

== Political career ==
Hayes was first elected to Dáil Éireann at the June 1927 general election as a TD for the Tipperary constituency, and held the seat until his defeat at the 1937 general election. He stood again at the 1943 general election and at by-election in 1947, but never returned to the Dáil.

In the 1938 election to the reconstituted Seanad Éireann, he was elected by the Labour Panel, and held the seat at the further election later that year to the 3rd Seanad. He lost his seat at the 1943 Seanad election. He was re-elected by the Labour Panel at the 1948 election to the 6th Seanad, and at subsequent elections until he stepped down at the 1965 election. He died on 4 January 1968.

Dáil	Election	Deputy (Party)	Deputy (Party)	Deputy (Party)	Deputy (Party)	Deputy (Party)	Deputy (Party)	Deputy (Party)
4th	1923	Dan Breen (Rep)	Séamus Burke (CnaG)	Louis Dalton (CnaG)	Daniel Morrissey (Lab)	Patrick Ryan (Rep)	Michael Heffernan (FP)	Seán McCurtin (CnaG)
5th	1927 (Jun)	Seán Hayes (FF)	Séamus Burke (CnaG)	John Hassett (CnaG)	Daniel Morrissey (Lab)	William O'Brien (Lab)	Michael Heffernan (FP)	Andrew Fogarty (FF)
6th	1927 (Sep)	Seán Hayes (FF)	Séamus Burke (CnaG)	John Hassett (CnaG)	Daniel Morrissey (Lab)	Timothy Sheehy (FF)	Michael Heffernan (FP)	Andrew Fogarty (FF)
7th	1932	Seán Hayes (FF)	Séamus Burke (CnaG)	John Hassett (CnaG)	Daniel Morrissey (Ind.)	Timothy Sheehy (FF)	Dan Breen (FF)	Andrew Fogarty (FF)
8th	1933	Seán Hayes (FF)	Séamus Burke (CnaG)	Richard Curran (NCP)	Daniel Morrissey (CnaG)	Martin Ryan (FF)	Dan Breen (FF)	Andrew Fogarty (FF)
9th	1937	William O'Brien (Lab)	Séamus Burke (FG)	Jeremiah Ryan (FG)	Daniel Morrissey (FG)	Martin Ryan (FF)	Dan Breen (FF)	Andrew Fogarty (FF)
10th	1938	Frank Loughman (FF)	Richard Curran (FG)	Jeremiah Ryan (FG)	Daniel Morrissey (FG)	Martin Ryan (FF)	Dan Breen (FF)	Andrew Fogarty (FF)
11th	1943	Richard Stapleton (Lab)	William O'Donnell (CnaT)	Jeremiah Ryan (FG)	Daniel Morrissey (FG)	Martin Ryan (FF)	Dan Breen (FF)	Andrew Fogarty (FF)
12th	1944	Frank Loughman (FF)	William O'Donnell (CnaT)	Richard Mulcahy (FG)	Daniel Morrissey (FG)	Mary Ryan (FF)	Dan Breen (FF)	Andrew Fogarty (FF)
12th	1947 by-election	Frank Loughman (FF)	Patrick Kinane (CnaP)	Richard Mulcahy (FG)	Daniel Morrissey (FG)	Mary Ryan (FF)	Dan Breen (FF)	Andrew Fogarty (FF)
13th	1948	Constituency abolished. See Tipperary North and Tipperary South						

Dáil	Election	Deputy (Party)	Deputy (Party)	Deputy (Party)	Deputy (Party)	Deputy (Party)
32nd	2016	Séamus Healy (WUA)	Alan Kelly (Lab)	Jackie Cahill (FF)	Michael Lowry (Ind.)	Mattie McGrath (Ind.)
33rd	2020	Martin Browne (SF)	Alan Kelly (Lab)	Jackie Cahill (FF)	Michael Lowry (Ind.)	Mattie McGrath (Ind.)
34th	2024	Constituency abolished. See Tipperary North and Tipperary South				
