= Daniel Morrissey =

Irish politician (1895–1981)

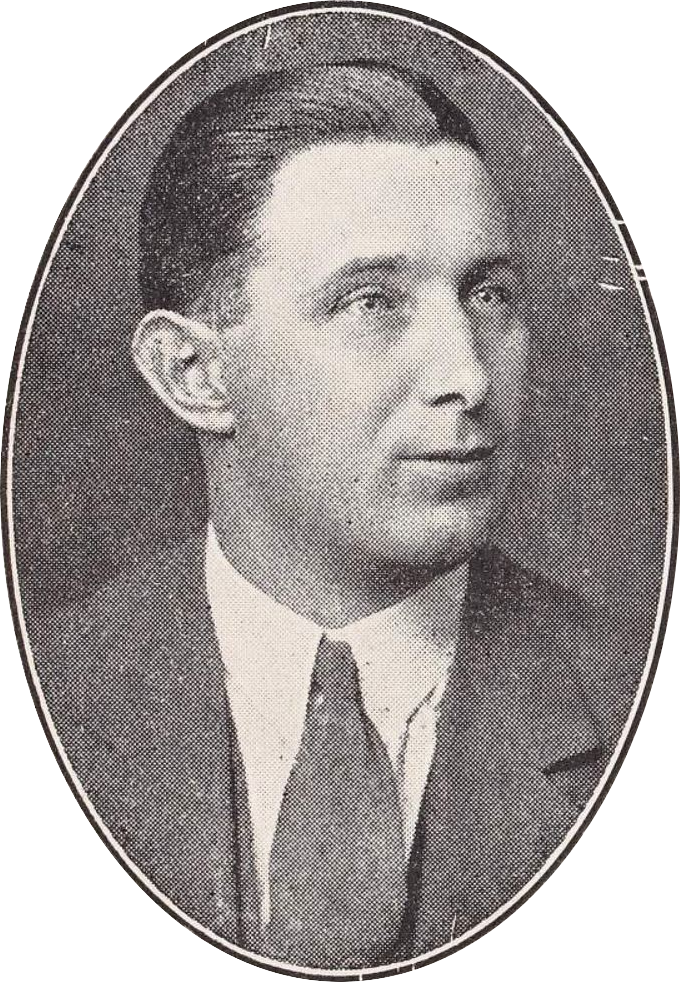
- Morrissey on a 1927 election poster

Minister for Justice
- In office 7 March 1951 – 13 June 1951
- Taoiseach: John A. Costello
- Preceded by: Seán Mac Eoin
- Succeeded by: Gerald Boland

Minister for Industry and Commerce
- In office 18 February 1948 – 7 March 1951
- Taoiseach: John A. Costello
- Preceded by: Seán Lemass
- Succeeded by: Thomas F. O'Higgins

Leas-Cheann Comhairle of Dáil Éireann
- In office 2 May 1928 – 29 January 1932
- Ceann Comhairle: Michael Hayes
- Preceded by: Patrick Hogan
- Succeeded by: Patrick Hogan

Teachta Dála
- In office February 1948 – March 1957
- Constituency: Tipperary North
- In office August 1923 – February 1948
- Constituency: Tipperary
- In office June 1922 – August 1923
- Constituency: Tipperary Mid, North and South

Personal details
- Born: 28 November 1895 Nenagh, County Tipperary, Ireland
- Died: 4 November 1981 (aged 85) Stillorgan, Dublin, Ireland
- Party: Fine Gael
- Other political affiliations: Labour Party (1922–1931); Independent (1931–1933); Cumann na nGaedheal (1933–1934)
- Spouse: Mary Morrissey
- Children: 7

Daniel Morrissey (28 November 1895 – 4 November 1981) was an Irish Fine Gael politician who served as Minister for Justice from March 1951 to June 1951, Minister for Industry and Commerce from 1948 to 1951 and Leas-Cheann Comhairle of Dáil Éireann from 1928 to 1932. He served as a Teachta Dála (TD) from 1922 to 1957.

== Early life ==
Morrissey was born in Nenagh, County Tipperary, the son of William Morrissey, a small carter-contractor, and his wife Bridget (née Gleeson). He was educated locally and, although he left school against his mother's wishes at the age of 12, he continued his own reading and studies.

== Trade unionism ==
Morrissey's interest in trade unionism began when he was working as a labourer with Great Southern Railways. He left after a dispute with his foreman in 1915 and joined the staff of a national insurance society. Almost at once he began organising trades union in South Tipperary. Rapidly advancing in the trade union movement, he was soon on the Irish Transport and General Workers' Union executive, a delegate to the Irish Trades Union Congress (ITUC) and fraternal delegate to the Scottish Trades Union Congress. Morrissey opposed the ITUC decision not to contest the 1918 general election.

== Political career ==
Morrissey was a successful candidate for the Labour Party at the 1920 local elections. At the 1922 general election, the first national election contested by Labour, he won a seat the Tipperary Mid, North and South constituency. Ernie O'Malley had threatened to shoot Morrissey unless he withdrew his candidacy, but backed down when Dan Breen threatened to shoot him in turn. As a result of the outbreak of the Civil War the new Dáil did not meet for several months. Though Anti-Treaty Sinn Féin TDs abstained, Morrissey and his 16 Labour Party colleagues attended and became the official opposition. In 1923, he became Labour Party Chief Whip and served as Leas-Cheann Comhairle of Dáil Éireann between 1928 and 1932.

In 1931, Morrissey defied the Labour whip and supported the Constitution (Amendment No. 17) Bill, a measure proposed by the government of W. T. Cosgrave against the Irish Republican Army. The Executive Council sought to establish military courts that were empowered to impose sentences – including capital punishment, without appeal – in response to IRA violence. Motivated by two recent murders in his constituency, Morrissey broke ranks with Labour, who thought the measures too authoritarian and voted for the bill, resulting in him being expelled from the party alongside Richard Anthony. He was re-elected as an Independent at the 1932 general election, before joining Cumann na nGaedheal (which became Fine Gael in 1933 after a merger).

Following the 1948 general election, Fine Gael leader Richard Mulcahy proposed the idea of forming a coalition government and ousting Fianna Fáil after 16 years in government. Morrissey was instrumental in securing the support of his former colleagues in the Labour Party and the breakaway National Labour Party. After successful negotiations Morrissey became the first Minister to be appointed in the First Inter-Party Government, as Minister for Industry and Commerce. He proved to be an active Minister, establishing Córas Tráchtála and the Industrial Development Authority as well as nationalising CIÉ. Morrissey was also a member of the negotiating team which concluded the Anglo-Irish Treaty of 1948. He was appointed Minister for Justice in a cabinet reshuffle in 1951 and held the position until the collapse of the government later that year.

Following the 1954 general election, Morrissey was a member of the negotiating team which created the second inter-party government. He declined a cabinet position due to his age.

Morrissey retired from the Dáil on health grounds at the 1957 general election.

== Later life ==
In retirement from politics, Morrissey returned to his auctioneering business where he worked until 1965. He died at his home in Stillorgan, Dublin, on 4 November 1981.

== Appraisal ==
In Professor Tom Garvin's review of the 1950s News from a New Republic, Morrissey comes in for praise as a moderniser and the instigator of the Industrial Development Authority. Garvin places him with a cross party group including Gerard Sweetman of Fine Gael and William Norton of the Labour Party as well as Seán Lemass of Fianna Fáil who were pushing a modernising agenda.

Political offices
Preceded by Seán Lemass	Minister for Industry and Commerce; 1948–1951	Succeeded by Thomas F. O'Higgins
Preceded by Seán Mac Eoin	Minister for Justice; 1951	Succeeded by Gerald Boland

Dáil	Election	Deputy (Party)	Deputy (Party)	Deputy (Party)	Deputy (Party)
2nd	1921	Patrick O'Byrne (SF)	Séamus Burke (SF)	Joseph MacDonagh (SF)	P. J. Moloney (SF)
3rd	1922	Daniel Morrissey (Lab)	Séamus Burke (PT-SF)	Joseph MacDonagh (AT-SF)	P. J. Moloney (AT-SF)
4th	1923	Constituency abolished. See Tipperary			

Dáil	Election	Deputy (Party)	Deputy (Party)	Deputy (Party)	Deputy (Party)	Deputy (Party)	Deputy (Party)	Deputy (Party)
4th	1923	Dan Breen (Rep)	Séamus Burke (CnaG)	Louis Dalton (CnaG)	Daniel Morrissey (Lab)	Patrick Ryan (Rep)	Michael Heffernan (FP)	Seán McCurtin (CnaG)
5th	1927 (Jun)	Seán Hayes (FF)	Séamus Burke (CnaG)	John Hassett (CnaG)	Daniel Morrissey (Lab)	William O'Brien (Lab)	Michael Heffernan (FP)	Andrew Fogarty (FF)
6th	1927 (Sep)	Seán Hayes (FF)	Séamus Burke (CnaG)	John Hassett (CnaG)	Daniel Morrissey (Lab)	Timothy Sheehy (FF)	Michael Heffernan (FP)	Andrew Fogarty (FF)
7th	1932	Seán Hayes (FF)	Séamus Burke (CnaG)	John Hassett (CnaG)	Daniel Morrissey (Ind.)	Timothy Sheehy (FF)	Dan Breen (FF)	Andrew Fogarty (FF)
8th	1933	Seán Hayes (FF)	Séamus Burke (CnaG)	Richard Curran (NCP)	Daniel Morrissey (CnaG)	Martin Ryan (FF)	Dan Breen (FF)	Andrew Fogarty (FF)
9th	1937	William O'Brien (Lab)	Séamus Burke (FG)	Jeremiah Ryan (FG)	Daniel Morrissey (FG)	Martin Ryan (FF)	Dan Breen (FF)	Andrew Fogarty (FF)
10th	1938	Frank Loughman (FF)	Richard Curran (FG)	Jeremiah Ryan (FG)	Daniel Morrissey (FG)	Martin Ryan (FF)	Dan Breen (FF)	Andrew Fogarty (FF)
11th	1943	Richard Stapleton (Lab)	William O'Donnell (CnaT)	Jeremiah Ryan (FG)	Daniel Morrissey (FG)	Martin Ryan (FF)	Dan Breen (FF)	Andrew Fogarty (FF)
12th	1944	Frank Loughman (FF)	William O'Donnell (CnaT)	Richard Mulcahy (FG)	Daniel Morrissey (FG)	Mary Ryan (FF)	Dan Breen (FF)	Andrew Fogarty (FF)
12th	1947 by-election	Frank Loughman (FF)	Patrick Kinane (CnaP)	Richard Mulcahy (FG)	Daniel Morrissey (FG)	Mary Ryan (FF)	Dan Breen (FF)	Andrew Fogarty (FF)
13th	1948	Constituency abolished. See Tipperary North and Tipperary South						

Dáil	Election	Deputy (Party)	Deputy (Party)	Deputy (Party)	Deputy (Party)	Deputy (Party)
32nd	2016	Séamus Healy (WUA)	Alan Kelly (Lab)	Jackie Cahill (FF)	Michael Lowry (Ind.)	Mattie McGrath (Ind.)
33rd	2020	Martin Browne (SF)	Alan Kelly (Lab)	Jackie Cahill (FF)	Michael Lowry (Ind.)	Mattie McGrath (Ind.)
34th	2024	Constituency abolished. See Tipperary North and Tipperary South				

Dáil	Election	Deputy (Party)	Deputy (Party)	Deputy (Party)
13th	1948	Patrick Kinane (CnaP)	Mary Ryan (FF)	Daniel Morrissey (FG)
14th	1951	John Fanning (FF)	Mary Ryan (FF)	Daniel Morrissey (FG)
15th	1954	John Fanning (FF)	Mary Ryan (FF)	Daniel Morrissey (FG)
16th	1957	John Fanning (FF)	Mary Ryan (FF)	Patrick Tierney (Lab)
17th	1961	John Fanning (FF)	Thomas Dunne (FG)	Patrick Tierney (Lab)
18th	1965	John Fanning (FF)	Thomas Dunne (FG)	Patrick Tierney (Lab)
19th	1969	Michael O'Kennedy (FF)	Thomas Dunne (FG)	Michael Smith (FF)
20th	1973	Michael O'Kennedy (FF)	Thomas Dunne (FG)	John Ryan (Lab)
21st	1977	Michael O'Kennedy (FF)	Michael Smith (FF)	John Ryan (Lab)
22nd	1981	David Molony (FG)	Michael Smith (FF)	John Ryan (Lab)
23rd	1982 (Feb)	David Molony (FG)	Michael O'Kennedy (FF)	John Ryan (Lab)
24th	1982 (Nov)	David Molony (FG)	Michael O'Kennedy (FF)	John Ryan (Lab)
25th	1987	Michael Lowry (FG)	Michael O'Kennedy (FF)	Michael Smith (FF)
26th	1989	Michael Lowry (FG)	Michael O'Kennedy (FF)	Michael Smith (FF)
27th	1992	Michael Lowry (FG)	John Ryan (Lab)	Michael Smith (FF)
28th	1997	Michael Lowry (Ind.)	Michael O'Kennedy (FF)	Michael Smith (FF)
29th	2002	Michael Lowry (Ind.)	Máire Hoctor (FF)	Michael Smith (FF)
30th	2007	Michael Lowry (Ind.)	Máire Hoctor (FF)	Noel Coonan (FG)
31st	2011	Michael Lowry (Ind.)	Alan Kelly (Lab)	Noel Coonan (FG)
32nd	2016	Constituency abolished. See Tipperary and Offaly		

Dáil	Election	Deputy (Party)	Deputy (Party)	Deputy (Party)
34th	2024	Michael Lowry (Ind.)	Alan Kelly (Lab)	Ryan O'Meara (FF)
