= Michael Heffernan (politician) =

Irish politician (1885–1970)

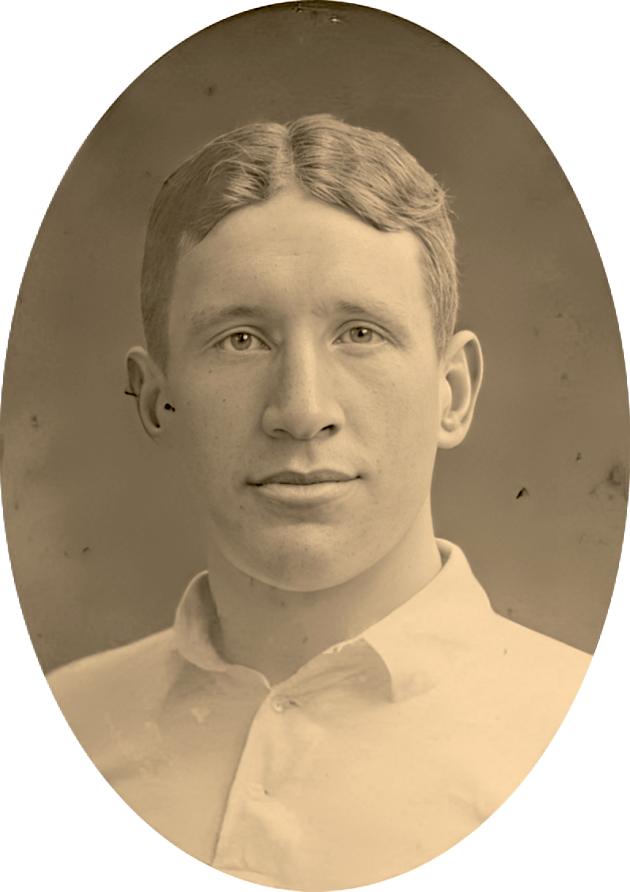
- Heffernan, c.1910s

Leader of the Farmers' Party
- In office 1927–1932
- Preceded by: Patrick Baxter
- Succeeded by: Party dissolved

Parliamentary Secretary
- 1927–1932: Posts and Telegraphs

Teachta Dála
- In office August 1923 – February 1932
- Constituency: Tipperary

Personal details
- Born: 3 April 1885 Carrick-on-Suir, County Tipperary, Ireland
- Died: 21 October 1970 (aged 85) Dalkey, County Dublin, Ireland
- Party: Farmers' Party
- Other political affiliations: Cumann na nGaedheal

Military service
- Allegiance: Canada
- Branch/service: Canadian Army
- Battles/wars: World War I

Michael Richard Heffernan (3 April 1885 – 21 November 1970) was an Irish politician, sportsperson and soldier.

== Early life ==
While working as a bank clerk in Skibbereen, County Cork, Heffernan played rugby for Cork Constitution in the 1900s and by 1911 had risen to the level of playing for the Ireland national rugby union team, earning 4 caps including one against England and one against France. He had also played for Munster Rugby.

In 1911 Heffernan emigrated to Canada, continuing his career as a bank clerk there. In 1914 he enlisted with the Canadian Army and fought in World War I. Following the war he returned to Ireland and began farming on the family holding at Kilmurray Lodge, Ballyneally, near Carrick-on-Suir, County Tipperary in 1920.

== Political career ==
Heffernan was county secretary of the South Tipperary Farmers Association. He was first elected to Dáil Éireann at the 1923 general election as a Farmers' Party Teachta Dála (TD) for Tipperary. In 1927 he became the final leader of the Farmers' Party. He led the party into coalition with Cumann na nGaedheal and for this he was appointed as Parliamentary Secretary to the Minister for Posts and Telegraphs Ernest Blythe from 1927 to 1932. By 1932 the Farmer's Party had lost its voter base of farmers to Cumann na nGaedheal, who were able to secure the backing of large farmers, and to Fianna Fáil, who were able to secure the backing of the farmers with smallholdings. In the face of this, the Farmer's Party dissolved, with both their supporters and their members going in three directions: Cumann na nGaedheal, Fianna Fáil, and a final holdout cohort who created the short-lived National Centre Party.

Heffernan himself joined Cumann na nGaedheal, standing as one of their candidates at the 1932 general election. He was not successful however and ended up losing his seat. Following his defeat he retired from politics.

== Later life ==
He was manager of the Arklow Pottery plant in County Wicklow from 1934 until his retirement. He died at his home in Dalkey, County Dublin on 21 November 1970, aged 85 years old.

Political offices
New office	Parliamentary Secretary to the Minister for Posts and Telegraphs; 1927–1932	Succeeded by Patrick Lalor

Dáil	Election	Deputy (Party)	Deputy (Party)	Deputy (Party)	Deputy (Party)	Deputy (Party)	Deputy (Party)	Deputy (Party)
4th	1923	Dan Breen (Rep)	Séamus Burke (CnaG)	Louis Dalton (CnaG)	Daniel Morrissey (Lab)	Patrick Ryan (Rep)	Michael Heffernan (FP)	Seán McCurtin (CnaG)
5th	1927 (Jun)	Seán Hayes (FF)	Séamus Burke (CnaG)	John Hassett (CnaG)	Daniel Morrissey (Lab)	William O'Brien (Lab)	Michael Heffernan (FP)	Andrew Fogarty (FF)
6th	1927 (Sep)	Seán Hayes (FF)	Séamus Burke (CnaG)	John Hassett (CnaG)	Daniel Morrissey (Lab)	Timothy Sheehy (FF)	Michael Heffernan (FP)	Andrew Fogarty (FF)
7th	1932	Seán Hayes (FF)	Séamus Burke (CnaG)	John Hassett (CnaG)	Daniel Morrissey (Ind.)	Timothy Sheehy (FF)	Dan Breen (FF)	Andrew Fogarty (FF)
8th	1933	Seán Hayes (FF)	Séamus Burke (CnaG)	Richard Curran (NCP)	Daniel Morrissey (CnaG)	Martin Ryan (FF)	Dan Breen (FF)	Andrew Fogarty (FF)
9th	1937	William O'Brien (Lab)	Séamus Burke (FG)	Jeremiah Ryan (FG)	Daniel Morrissey (FG)	Martin Ryan (FF)	Dan Breen (FF)	Andrew Fogarty (FF)
10th	1938	Frank Loughman (FF)	Richard Curran (FG)	Jeremiah Ryan (FG)	Daniel Morrissey (FG)	Martin Ryan (FF)	Dan Breen (FF)	Andrew Fogarty (FF)
11th	1943	Richard Stapleton (Lab)	William O'Donnell (CnaT)	Jeremiah Ryan (FG)	Daniel Morrissey (FG)	Martin Ryan (FF)	Dan Breen (FF)	Andrew Fogarty (FF)
12th	1944	Frank Loughman (FF)	William O'Donnell (CnaT)	Richard Mulcahy (FG)	Daniel Morrissey (FG)	Mary Ryan (FF)	Dan Breen (FF)	Andrew Fogarty (FF)
12th	1947 by-election	Frank Loughman (FF)	Patrick Kinane (CnaP)	Richard Mulcahy (FG)	Daniel Morrissey (FG)	Mary Ryan (FF)	Dan Breen (FF)	Andrew Fogarty (FF)
13th	1948	Constituency abolished. See Tipperary North and Tipperary South						

Dáil	Election	Deputy (Party)	Deputy (Party)	Deputy (Party)	Deputy (Party)	Deputy (Party)
32nd	2016	Séamus Healy (WUA)	Alan Kelly (Lab)	Jackie Cahill (FF)	Michael Lowry (Ind.)	Mattie McGrath (Ind.)
33rd	2020	Martin Browne (SF)	Alan Kelly (Lab)	Jackie Cahill (FF)	Michael Lowry (Ind.)	Mattie McGrath (Ind.)
34th	2024	Constituency abolished. See Tipperary North and Tipperary South				
