= Tipperary (Dáil constituency) =

Dáil constituency (1923–1948, 2016–2024)

- Former Dáil constituency
- Major settlements: Carrick-on-Suir; Cashel; Clonmel; Nenagh; Roscrea; Thurles; Tipperary

Former constituency
- Created: 2016
- Abolished: 2024
- Seats: 5
- Local government area: County Tipperary
- Created from: Tipperary North; Tipperary South
- Replaced by: Tipperary North; Tipperary South
- EP constituency: South

Tipperary was a parliamentary constituency that was represented in Dáil Éireann, the house of representatives of the Oireachtas (the legislature of Ireland), from 1923 to 1948 and again from 2016 to 2024. The constituency elected deputies (Teachtaí Dála, commonly known as TDs) on the system of proportional representation by means of the single transferable vote (PR-STV).

== History and boundaries ==
Tipperary
- Former Dáil constituency

Former constituency
- Created: 1923
- Abolished: 1948
- Seats: 7
- Local government areas: North Tipperary; South Tipperary
- Created from: Tipperary Mid, North and South; Waterford–Tipperary East
- Replaced by: Tipperary North; Tipperary South

The constituency was created under the Electoral Act 1923, and was first used at the 1923 general election, incorporating the separate counties of North Tipperary and South Tipperary. It was abolished in 1948.

The Constituency Commission proposed in its 2012 report that at the next general election a new constituency called Tipperary be created, as part of changes that reduced the total number of TDs from 166 to 158. This occurred in 2016, shortly after the administrative amalgamation in 2014 of the separate counties to form County Tipperary.

In August 2023, the Electoral Commission published its review of constituency boundaries in Ireland, which recommended that the constituency of Tipperary be abolished, with the creation of two new three-seat constituencies: Tipperary North and Tipperary South. Each new constituency would elect 3 deputies. These changes came into effect for the 2024 general election under the Electoral (Amendment) Act 2023.

Changes to the Tipperary constituency 1923–1948, 2016–present
Years	Seats	Area	Change
1923–1948	7	North Tipperary and South Tipperary	
1948–2016	—	Constituency abolished	See Tipperary North and Tipperary South
2016–2020	5	County Tipperary, except for the part in the Offaly constituency.	Amalgamation of Tipperary North and Tipperary South; transfer of the electoral divisions of Aglishcloghane, Ballingarry, Ballylusky, Borrisokane, Carrig, Cloghjordan, Cloghprior, Clohaskin, Finnoe, Graigue, Kilbarron, Lorrha East, Lorrha West, Mertonhall, Rathcabban, Redwood, Riverstown, Terryglass, and Uskane, in the former Rural District of Borrisokane; and Ardcrony, Ballygibbon, Ballymackey, Knigh, and Monsea, in the former Rural District of Nenagh to the new Offaly constituency; transfer of electoral divisions in Waterford City and County to Waterford.
2020–2024	5	County Tipperary, except for the part in the Limerick City constituency	Transfer of electoral divisions from the former Offaly constituency; transfer of Birdhill, Kilcomenty, Newport in the former Rural District of Nenagh to the Limerick City constituency.

== TDs ==
=== TDs 1923–1948 ===
Teachtaí Dála (TDs) for Tipperary 1923–1948
Key to parties: CnaT = Clann na Talmhan; CnaP = Clann na Poblachta; CnaG = Cumann na nGaedheal; FP = Farmers' Party; FF = Fianna Fáil; FG = Fine Gael; Ind = Independent; Lab = Labour; NCP = National Centre Party; Rep = Republican
Dáil	Election	Deputy (Party)	Deputy (Party)	Deputy (Party)	Deputy (Party)	Deputy (Party)	Deputy (Party)	Deputy (Party)
4th	1923	Dan Breen (Rep)	Séamus Burke (CnaG)	Louis Dalton (CnaG)	Daniel Morrissey (Lab)	Patrick Ryan (Rep)	Michael Heffernan (FP)	Seán McCurtin (CnaG)
5th	1927 (Jun)	Seán Hayes (FF)	Séamus Burke (CnaG)	John Hassett (CnaG)	Daniel Morrissey (Lab)	William O'Brien (Lab)	Michael Heffernan (FP)	Andrew Fogarty (FF)
6th	1927 (Sep)	Seán Hayes (FF)	Séamus Burke (CnaG)	John Hassett (CnaG)	Daniel Morrissey (Lab)	Timothy Sheehy (FF)	Michael Heffernan (FP)	Andrew Fogarty (FF)
7th	1932	Seán Hayes (FF)	Séamus Burke (CnaG)	John Hassett (CnaG)	Daniel Morrissey (Ind)	Timothy Sheehy (FF)	Dan Breen (FF)	Andrew Fogarty (FF)
8th	1933	Seán Hayes (FF)	Séamus Burke (CnaG)	Richard Curran (NCP)	Daniel Morrissey (CnaG)	Martin Ryan (FF)	Dan Breen (FF)	Andrew Fogarty (FF)
9th	1937	William O'Brien (Lab)	Séamus Burke (FG)	Jeremiah Ryan (FG)	Daniel Morrissey (FG)	Martin Ryan (FF)	Dan Breen (FF)	Andrew Fogarty (FF)
10th	1938	Frank Loughman (FF)	Richard Curran (FG)	Jeremiah Ryan (FG)	Daniel Morrissey (FG)	Martin Ryan (FF)	Dan Breen (FF)	Andrew Fogarty (FF)
11th	1943	Richard Stapleton (Lab)	William O'Donnell (CnaT)	Jeremiah Ryan (FG)	Daniel Morrissey (FG)	Martin Ryan (FF)	Dan Breen (FF)	Andrew Fogarty (FF)
12th	1944	Frank Loughman (FF)	William O'Donnell (CnaT)	Richard Mulcahy (FG)	Daniel Morrissey (FG)	Mary Ryan (FF)	Dan Breen (FF)	Andrew Fogarty (FF)
12th	1947 by-election	Frank Loughman (FF)	Patrick Kinane (CnaP)	Richard Mulcahy (FG)	Daniel Morrissey (FG)	Mary Ryan (FF)	Dan Breen (FF)	Andrew Fogarty (FF)
13th	1948	Constituency abolished. See Tipperary North and Tipperary South						

Note: The columns in this table are used only for presentational purposes, and no significance should be attached to the order of columns. For details of the order in which seats were won at each election, see the detailed results of that election.

=== TDs since 2016 ===
Teachtaí Dála (TDs) for Tipperary 2016–2024
Key to parties: FF = Fianna Fáil; Ind = Independent; Lab = Labour; SF = Sinn Féin; WUA = Workers and Unemployed
Dáil	Election	Deputy (Party)	Deputy (Party)	Deputy (Party)	Deputy (Party)	Deputy (Party)
32nd	2016	Séamus Healy (WUA)	Alan Kelly (Lab)	Jackie Cahill (FF)	Michael Lowry (Ind)	Mattie McGrath (Ind)
33rd	2020	Martin Browne (SF)	Alan Kelly (Lab)	Jackie Cahill (FF)	Michael Lowry (Ind)	Mattie McGrath (Ind)
34th	2024	Constituency abolished. See Tipperary North and Tipperary South				

Note: The columns in this table are used only for presentational purposes, and no significance should be attached to the order of columns. For details of the order in which seats were won at each election, see the detailed results of that election.

== Elections ==
*: Outgoing TD

=== 2020 general election ===
2020 general election: Tipperary
Party	Candidate	FPv%	Count								
Party	Candidate	FPv%	1	2	3	4	5	6	7	8	9
Independent	Michael Lowry	18.1	14,802								
Sinn Féin	Martin Browne	12.2	10,004	10,126	10,304	10,834	11,207	11,805	11,964	14,046	
Independent	Mattie McGrath	11.4	9,321	9,533	9,815	10,152	11,147	11,727	12,478	15,127	
Fianna Fáil	Jackie Cahill	9.7	7,940	8,171	8,948	9,114	10,809	11,684	12,118	12,535	12,939
Labour	Alan Kelly	9.6	7,857	7,979	8,445	9,282	9,618	11,390	12,135	12,773	13,222
Fine Gael	Garret Ahearn	7.6	6,206	6,273	6,327	6,553	6,837	7,034	10,626	11,086	11,499
Independent	Séamus Healy (Note: Healy was a member of the Workers and Unemployed Action party but stood as a non-party/independent candidate in this election.)	7.1	5,829	5,866	5,950	6,306	6,656	6,936	7,058		
Fine Gael	Mary Newman Julian	6.0	4,926	5,054	5,149	5,518	5,730	6,206			
Independent	Joe Hannigan	5.8	4,715	4,826	5,133	5,313	5,461				
Fianna Fáil	Imelda Goldsboro	5.0	4,082	4,139	4,631	4,749					
Green	Rob O'Donnell	3.9	3,170	3,201	3,315						
Fianna Fáil	Sandra Farrell	2.7	2,233	2,275							
Irish Freedom	Dolores Cahill	0.6	521	527							
Independent	Marese Skehan (Note: The existing ballot paper, which contained the name of the deceased candidate, Marese Skehan, was still used.)	0.2	182	186							
Electorate: 126,781 Valid: 81,788 Spoilt: 635 Quota: 13,632 Turnout: 65.0%

On 3 February 2020, following the death of independent candidate, Marese Skehan, the election in the Tipperary constituency was due to be postponed, with nominations to be re-opened. However, on 5 February the Minister for Housing, Planning and Local Government issued a Special Difficulty Order allowing the election to proceed on the same date as other constituencies. This was in consideration of the constitutional requirement that elections take place within 30 days of the dissolution of the Dáil.

=== 2016 general election ===
2016 general election: Tipperary
Party	Candidate	FPv%	Count						
Party	Candidate	FPv%	1	2	3	4	5	6	7
Independent	Michael Lowry	16.8	13,064						
Independent	Mattie McGrath	14.4	11,237	11,781	12,819	13,064			
Labour	Alan Kelly	9.9	7,746	8,209	8,387	9,456	9,958	11,067	11,750
Independent	Séamus Healy (Note: Healy was a member of the Workers and Unemployed Action party but was officially a non-party/independent candidate at this election.)	9.6	7,452	7,834	8,477	8,572	11,427	12,029	12,874
Fianna Fáil	Jackie Cahill	9.5	7,414	7,542	9,103	9,530	10,114	15,062	
Fianna Fáil	Michael Smith	8.6	6,718	6,817	7,565	8,165	8,891		
Fine Gael	Tom Hayes	8.0	6,218	6,821	7,026	9,373	9,560	9,943	10,437
Sinn Féin	Seamus Morris	7.3	5,724	5,921	6,038	6,205			
Fine Gael	Noel Coonan	6.1	4,782	5,140	5,193				
Fianna Fáil	Siobhán Ambrose	5.7	4,472	4,687					
Fine Gael	Marie Murphy	2.0	1,542						
Green	Gearóid Fitzgibbon	1.7	1,341						
Independent	Michael Dillon	0.3	238						
Electorate: 112,615 Valid: 77,948 Spoilt: 646 Quota: 12,992 Turnout: 69.8%

=== 1947 by-election ===
Clann na Talmhan TD William O'Donnell died on 4 February 1947. A by-election was held to fill the vacancy on 29 October 1947.

1947 by-election: Tipperary
Party	Candidate	FPv%	Count			
Party	Candidate	FPv%	1	2	3	4
Fianna Fáil	Seán Hayes	32.1	17,169	18,156	19,868	21,647
Clann na Poblachta	Patrick Kinane	21.4	11,471	13,004	16,281	23,265
Fine Gael	Jeremiah Ryan	21.2	11,341	14,386	15,795	
Labour	Denis O'Sullivan	13.5	7,201	7,427		
Clann na Talmhan	Michael Fitzgerald	11.8	6,328			
Electorate: 81,112 Valid: 53,510 Quota: 26,756 Turnout: 66.0%

=== 1944 general election ===
1944 general election: Tipperary
Party	Candidate	FPv%	Count									
Party	Candidate	FPv%	1	2	3	4	5	6	7	8	9	10
Fianna Fáil	Dan Breen	17.3	10,571									
Fine Gael	Richard Mulcahy	13.0	7,989									
Fianna Fáil	Mary Ryan	12.0	7,330	7,682								
Fianna Fáil	Andrew Fogarty	9.5	5,791	7,606	7,837							
Fine Gael	Daniel Morrissey	8.3	5,061	5,123	5,209	6,542	6,799	6,800	6,805	7,090	7,403	8,025
Fianna Fáil	Frank Loughman	7.7	4,705	4,979	5,075	5,173	5,177	5,187	5,265	5,597	7,760	
Clann na Talmhan	William O'Donnell	7.6	4,638	4,692	4,772	5,078	5,118	5,118	5,123	5,275	5,348	7,305
Labour	John Boland	5.6	3,420	3,460	3,584	3,622	3,625	3,626	3,632	5,547	5,713	5,890
Clann na Talmhan	John Stakelum	4.9	3,026	3,050	3,121	3,201	3,217	3,218	3,227	3,360	3,442	
Labour	Richard Stapleton	4.6	2,821	2,874	3,039	3,100	3,110	3,111	3,122			
Fianna Fáil	James Gardiner	4.5	2,758	2,912	3,025	3,143	3,144	3,154	3,219	3,317		
Fine Gael	Thomas Bourke	3.4	2,079	2,131	2,163							
Ailtirí na hAiséirghe	Tomás Ó Dochartaigh	1.8	1,072	1,105								
Electorate: 82,815 Valid: 61,261 Quota: 7,658 Turnout: 74.0%

=== 1943 general election ===
1943 general election: Tipperary
Party	Candidate	FPv%	Count																				
Party	Candidate	FPv%	1	2	3	4	5	6	7	8	9	10	11	12	13	14	15	16	17	18	19	20	21
Fianna Fáil	Dan Breen	13.4	8,742																				
Fine Gael	Daniel Morrissey	7.9	5,178	5,183	5,219	5,240	6,012	6,046	6,347	6,462	6,626	6,701	7,182	7,776	8,119	8,171	8,329						
Fianna Fáil	Martin Ryan	7.3	4,775	4,809	4,815	4,825	4,848	4,896	4,904	4,996	5,110	5,145	5,676	5,716	5,868	6,075	6,871	6,893	7,551	8,960			
Fianna Fáil	Andrew Fogarty	6.1	4,010	4,282	4,377	4,408	4,432	4,544	4,603	4,636	4,666	4,828	4,898	5,040	5,117	6,449	7,606	7,622	9,815				
Fine Gael	Jeremiah Ryan	5.8	3,796	3,802	3,835	3,848	3,898	3,927	4,069	4,091	4,152	4,174	4,235	4,702	4,770	4,872	5,013	5,033	5,126	5,194	5,205	7,217	8,424
Clann na Talmhan	William O'Donnell	5.5	3,582	3,590	3,600	3,610	3,623	3,671	3,784	3,791	4,422	4,446	5,187	5,405	5,432	5,468	5,501	5,517	5,612	5,640	5,695	6,282	6,553
Independent	Daniel Kennedy	5.4	3,538	3,558	3,645	3,674	3,687	3,775	3,793	3,835	3,869	4,090	4,118	4,308	4,347	4,425	4,488	4,491	4,530	4,547	4,577	4,695	
Independent	Séamus Burke	5.0	3,300	3,307	3,325	3,347	3,438	3,467	3,522	3,566	3,667	3,698	3,787	3,978	4,044	4,146	4,476	4,494	4,541	4,553	4,580	4,910	5,351
Fianna Fáil	Frank Loughman	4.2	2,747	2,786	2,791	2,825	2,831	2,947	2,982	2,996	3,012	3,045	3,053	3,069	3,098	3,597	3,804	3,807					
Fianna Fáil	Thomas Meagher	4.1	2,681	2,695	2,697	2,701	2,713	2,740	2,747	2,789	2,820	2,832	2,892	2,915	2,975	3,218							
Fine Gael	Denis Bourke	3.8	2,489	2,501	2,508	2,554	2,618	2,643	3,151	3,159	3,169	3,208	3,228	3,828	3,843	3,870	3,914	3,918	4,028	4,054	4,086		
Fianna Fáil	Seán Hayes	3.8	2,481	2,549	2,557	2,580	2,586	2,712	2,734	2,760	2,766	2,823	2,849	2,885	2,938								
Fine Gael	Thomas Bourke	3.5	2,272	2,281	2,286	2,298	2,338	2,350	2,509	2,519	2,570	2,699	2,757										
Labour	Richard Stapleton	3.5	2,258	2,263	2,281	2,347	2,350	2,594	2,623	2,905	2,912	3,868	3,944	3,977	5,582	5,672	5,738	5,742	5,986	6,052	6,186	6,505	7,263
Labour	Patrick Tierney	3.1	2,010	2,012	2,017	2,021	2,040	2,081	2,083	2,549	2,568	2,754	2,850	2,875									
Clann na Talmhan	Timothy Sheehy	2.8	1,796	1,799	1,800	1,804	1,832	1,867	1,869	1,942	2,518	2,547											
Clann na Talmhan	John Lee	2.7	1,758	1,760	1,762	1,771	1,806	1,842	1,868	1,886													
Labour	William Cotter	2.7	1,744	1,772	1,779	1,840	1,846	1,906	1,921	2,139	2,147												
Fine Gael	Richard Curran	2.2	1,426	1,429	1,433	1,452	1,496	1,545															
Labour	Thomas Malone	2.1	1,383	1,388	1,393	1,419	1,453	1,563	1,569														
Córas na Poblachta	Denis J. O'Driscoll	2.0	1,297	1,303	1,312	1,328	1,333																
Fine Gael	Anthony Esmonde	2.0	1,289	1,292	1,294	1,310																	
Independent	Mary Corbett	0.7	466	477	505																		
Independent	Mary Phillips	0.6	408	409																			
Electorate: 82,815 Valid: 65,426 Quota: 8,179 Turnout: 79.0%

=== 1938 general election ===
1938 general election: Tipperary
Party	Candidate	FPv%	Count					
Party	Candidate	FPv%	1	2	3	4	5	6
Fianna Fáil	Dan Breen	14.7	9,984					
Fine Gael	Jeremiah Ryan	11.4	7,745	7,766	7,941	7,953	7,978	8,662
Fianna Fáil	Andrew Fogarty	11.1	7,529	8,473	9,401			
Fianna Fáil	Martin Ryan	10.6	7,174	7,297	10,179			
Fine Gael	Daniel Morrissey	10.3	6,976	6,999	7,297	7,357	7,374	8,957
Labour	William O'Brien	8.9	6,009	6,080	6,306	6,361	6,386	6,554
Fine Gael	Richard Curran	8.8	5,960	6,017	6,047	6,058	6,079	9,180
Fine Gael	Séamus Burke	8.3	5,657	5,681	5,741	5,762	5,776	
Fianna Fáil	Frank Loughman	8.1	5,495	5,627	6,378	7,911	8,658	
Fianna Fáil	Seán Gaynor	7.9	5,361	5,463				
Electorate: 81,678 Valid: 67,890 Quota: 8,487 Turnout: 83.1%

=== 1937 general election ===
1937 general election: Tipperary
Party	Candidate	FPv%	Count									
Party	Candidate	FPv%	1	2	3	4	5	6	7	8	9	10
Fianna Fáil	Dan Breen	13.1	8,849									
Fine Gael	Daniel Morrissey	11.5	7,770	8,312	9,033							
Fine Gael	Séamus Burke	10.0	6,743	7,160	7,338	7,344	7,485	7,548	7,559	10,838		
Labour	William O'Brien	9.4	6,380	6,408	7,326	7,351	7,463	7,834	7,962	8,109	8,149	8,212
Fianna Fáil	Martin Ryan	8.3	5,611	5,709	6,153	6,182	6,200	6,959	8,186	8,283	8,329	8,372
Fianna Fáil	Andrew Fogarty	8.2	5,550	5,578	6,661	6,889	6,943	10,121				
Fianna Fáil	Timothy Sheehy	8.0	5,423	5,481	5,540	5,554	5,559	5,975	6,207	6,240	6,259	6,307
Fine Gael	Jeremiah Ryan	7.4	5,027	5,951	6,319	6,323	6,481	6,560	6,627	8,186	10,478	
Fianna Fáil	Seán Hayes	6.9	4,671	4,689	4,929	5,020	5,032					
Fine Gael	Richard Curran	6.5	4,420	5,068	5,186	5,197	5,289	5,342	5,357			
Independent	Daniel Kennedy	6.0	4,072	4,280								
Fine Gael	James Timoney	4.5	3,009									
Electorate: 82,727 Valid: 67,525 Quota: 8,441 Turnout: 81.6%

=== 1933 general election ===
1933 general election: Tipperary
Party	Candidate	FPv%	Count								
Party	Candidate	FPv%	1	2	3	4	5	6	7	8	9
Fianna Fáil	Andrew Fogarty	13.5	9,362								
Fianna Fáil	Seán Hayes	10.0	6,909	7,187	7,209	7,219	8,405	8,506	8,513	8,611	8,712
National Centre Party	Richard Curran	10.0	6,896	6,904	7,154	7,299	7,364	7,687	7,744	11,888	
Fianna Fáil	Martin Ryan	9.7	6,732	6,855	6,865	6,902	7,555	7,746	7,749	7,879	8,145
Fianna Fáil	Dan Breen	8.4	5,811	5,977	6,006	6,031	7,276	7,417	7,430	7,581	7,797
Fianna Fáil	Timothy Sheehy	8.2	5,707	5,734	5,734	5,766	5,987	6,098	6,100	6,155	6,268
Cumann na nGaedheal	Daniel Morrissey	7.4	5,104	5,109	5,546	7,442	7,767	9,583			
Cumann na nGaedheal	Séamus Burke	7.1	4,940	4,946	5,327	6,019	6,173	7,531	8,241	9,318	
National Centre Party	Joseph McCann	6.4	4,405	4,422	4,587	5,145	5,274	5,806	5,944		
Labour	William O'Brien	5.9	4,102	4,161	4,177	4,213					
Cumann na nGaedheal	Jeremiah Ryan	5.8	3,997	4,010	4,243	4,487	4,662				
Cumann na nGaedheal	Seán McCurtin	4.7	3,252	3,255	3,704						
Cumann na nGaedheal	Michael Heffernan	2.9	2,005	2,009							
Electorate: 82,499 Valid: 69,222 Quota: 8,653 Turnout: 83.9%

=== 1932 general election ===
1932 general election: Tipperary
Party	Candidate	FPv%	Count										
Party	Candidate	FPv%	1	2	3	4	5	6	7	8	9	10	11
Fianna Fáil	Dan Breen	13.6	8,817										
Cumann na nGaedheal	Séamus Burke	12.4	8,056	8,075	8,166								
Independent	Daniel Morrissey	9.8	6,388	6,402	6,635	7,191	7,590	8,980					
Fianna Fáil	Timothy Sheehy	8.2	5,332	5,347	5,412	5,432	5,436	5,529	5,595	5,741	9,077		
Fianna Fáil	Martin Ryan	7.4	4,806	4,838	4,866	5,032	5,046	5,124	5,193	5,432			
Fianna Fáil	Andrew Fogarty	7.4	4,787	4,890	4,925	5,486	5,546	5,625	5,648	8,003	9,084		
Fianna Fáil	Seán Hayes	7.1	4,611	4,700	4,800	5,072	5,276	5,326	5,343	7,245	7,680	8,413	
Fianna Fáil	James Davin	6.6	4,308	4,677	4,745	4,942	4,976	5,027	5,046				
Cumann na nGaedheal	John Hassett	6.5	4,196	4,211	4,240	4,391	5,161	6,559	6,932	7,093	7,286	7,328	7,483
Cumann na nGaedheal	Michael Heffernan	6.2	4,043	4,049	4,081	4,146	5,306	6,268	6,561	6,613	6,705	6,727	6,790
Cumann na nGaedheal	Seán McCurtin	5.4	3,517	3,526	3,563	3,648	4,186						
Cumann na nGaedheal	Patrick Henehan	4.8	3,111	3,113	3,160	3,215							
Labour	Daniel Kennedy	2.5	1,632	1,651	2,219								
Labour	Richard Stapleton	2.1	1,354	1,359									
Electorate: 80,805 Valid: 64,958 Quota: 8,120 Turnout: 80.4%

=== September 1927 general election ===
September 1927 general election: Tipperary
Party	Candidate	FPv%	Count								
Party	Candidate	FPv%	1	2	3	4	5	6	7	8	9
Cumann na nGaedheal	Séamus Burke	16.8	9,852								
Labour	Daniel Morrissey	14.2	8,344								
Fianna Fáil	Seán Hayes	11.2	6,567	6,593	6,619	6,638	6,767	7,477			
Farmers' Party	Michael Heffernan	10.1	5,914	6,188	6,204	6,564	6,936	6,977	6,981	7,230	7,263
Fianna Fáil	Andrew Fogarty	8.4	4,943	5,143	5,170	5,253	5,315	7,027	7,091	8,564	
Fianna Fáil	Timothy Sheehy	8.3	4,860	4,877	4,919	4,940	5,003	5,674	5,724	6,154	6,849
Cumann na nGaedheal	John Hassett	6.9	4,031	5,452	5,473	5,831	6,526	6,736	6,738	7,121	7,227
Fianna Fáil	Seán Gleeson	6.3	3,701	3,765	3,785	3,790	3,817				
Cumann na nGaedheal	Jeremiah Ryan	6.3	3,682	3,971	3,993	4,543	5,532	5,641	5,648	6,173	6,263
Labour	William O'Brien	4.6	2,668	2,728	3,553	3,616	3,902	4,200	4,220		
Cumann na nGaedheal	Laurence Tobin	4.1	2,398	2,508	2,514	2,745					
Cumann na nGaedheal	Richard Trecey	2.9	1,672	1,733	1,742						
Electorate: 81,381 Valid: 58,632 Quota: 7,330 Turnout: 72.1%

=== June 1927 general election ===
June 1927 general election: Tipperary
Party	Candidate	FPv%	Count														
Party	Candidate	FPv%	1	2	3	4	5	6	7	8	9	10	11	12	13	14	15
Labour	Daniel Morrissey	17.2	10,307														
Cumann na nGaedheal	Séamus Burke	13.4	8,043														
Fianna Fáil	Seán Hayes	8.7	5,232	5,272	5,275	5,411	5,446	5,457	5,553	5,613	5,817	5,843	5,921	6,106	6,107	6,998	7,105
Farmers' Party	Michael Heffernan	7.9	4,723	4,753	4,790	4,837	4,980	5,104	5,147	5,329	5,496	6,486	6,852	7,504			
Fianna Fáil	Andrew Fogarty	6.3	3,795	3,834	3,845	3,955	4,026	4,066	4,229	4,262	4,594	4,665	4,872	5,155	5,156	6,925	7,186
Fianna Fáil	Timothy Sheehy	6.1	3,626	3,671	3,673	3,675	3,683	3,694	4,239	4,249	4,271	4,637	5,019	5,050	5,050	5,286	5,389
Fianna Fáil	Seán Gleeson	5.0	2,998	3,035	3,039	3,078	3,115	3,146	3,314	3,331	3,434	3,474	3,640	3,705	3,705		
Cumann na nGaedheal	Patrick Ryan	5.0	2,991	3,028	3,098	3,131	3,221	3,368	3,376	3,642	3,772	3,844	4,053	4,279	4,289	4,319	
Cumann na nGaedheal	John Hassett	4.0	2,385	2,416	2,627	2,660	2,800	3,278	3,307	3,702	3,818	3,965	4,275	4,592	4,596	4,776	6,755
Labour	William O'Brien	3.7	2,224	4,469	4,489	4,797	4,894	4,957	5,047	5,382	5,689	5,760	6,163	6,851	6,856	7,092	7,547
Farmers' Party	John Seymour	3.4	2,011	2,059	2,068	2,070	2,094	2,170	2,283	2,311	2,335						
National League	Thomas Condon	3.2	1,908	1,930	1,956	2,200	2,512	2,533	2,540	2,585	2,738	2,758	2,914				
Independent	Frank McGrath	3.1	1,859	1,945	1,959	1,983	2,028	2,146	2,221	2,264	2,373	2,746					
Independent	Dan Breen	2.5	1,480	1,526	1,566	1,653	1,713	1,740	1,758	1,796							
Fianna Fáil	Michael Kennedy	2.3	1,401	1,426	1,428	1,431	1,440	1,468									
Cumann na nGaedheal	Patrick Morris	2.1	1,283	1,309	1,338	1,371	1,404	1,534	1,564								
Cumann na nGaedheal	Martin Maher	2.1	1,227	1,249	1,293	1,295	1,404										
National League	John Hackett	2.0	1,192	1,211	1,241	1,281											
Independent	John Cronin	2.0	1,175	1,201	1,209												
Electorate: 81,381 Valid: 59,860 Quota: 7,483 Turnout: 73.6%

=== 1923 general election ===
1923 general election: Tipperary
Party	Candidate	FPv%	Count												
Party	Candidate	FPv%	1	2	3	4	5	6	7	8	9	10	11	12	13
Cumann na nGaedheal	Séamus Burke	22.4	12,257												
Republican	Dan Breen	16.5	9,026												
Labour	Daniel Morrissey	10.2	5,580	5,735	5,861	5,945	6,008	6,073	6,161	6,285	6,323	6,365	6,495	6,711	7,110
Republican	Patrick Ryan	10.1	5,507	5,528	5,837	6,086	6,141	6,193	6,302	6,350	6,361	6,368	8,522		
Cumann na nGaedheal	Seán McCurtin	9.3	5,088	5,713	5,757	5,887	5,929	6,180	6,300	7,019					
Farmers' Party	Michael Heffernan	5.7	3,130	3,382	3,445	3,476	3,763	3,989	4,041	4,313	4,444	4,490	4,611	4,745	6,201
Labour	Patrick Doherty	5.4	2,955	3,139	3,404	3,480	3,533	3,540	3,577	3,637	3,662	3,673	3,827	4,365	4,442
Cumann na nGaedheal	Louis Dalton	5.1	2,793	5,975	6,090	6,106	6,185	6,453	6,467	7,174					
Farmers' Party	Martin Meagher	2.9	1,609	1,783	1,802	1,816	1,870	1,905	2,744	2,909	3,035	3,103	3,131	3,178	
Republican	William Quirke	2.9	1,569	1,588	2,632	2,693	2,727	2,810	2,856	2,879	2,886	2,895			
Cumann na nGaedheal	Martin Dwyer	2.6	1,427	2,065	2,108	2,118	2,145	2,241	2,279						
Farmers' Party	James O'Meara	2.4	1,321	1,370	1,381	1,392	1,441	1,473							
Independent	Patrick L. Ryan	1.9	1,037	1,099	1,131	1,143	1,191								
Farmers' Party	Peter Moloney	1.3	733	770	809	815									
Independent	William Gleeson	1.2	655	678	758										
Electorate: 86,703 Valid: 54,687 Quota: 6,836 Turnout: 63.1%
