= John Curtin (footballer) =

Australian rules footballer (1924–2019)

Personal information
- Full name: John Clark Curtin
- Born: 8 November 1924
- Died: 28 October 2019 (aged 94)
- Original team: Ormond Amateurs
- Height: 185 cm (6 ft 1 in)
- Weight: 89 kg (196 lb)
- Position: Defence

Playing career^{1}
Years	Club	Games (Goals)
1947	St Kilda	2 (0)
- ^{1} Playing statistics correct to the end of 1947.

John Clark Curtin (8 November 1924 – 28 October 2019) was an Australian rules footballer who played with St Kilda in the Victorian Football League (VFL).
