= Seán McCurtin =

Irish politician and army officer (1896–1982)

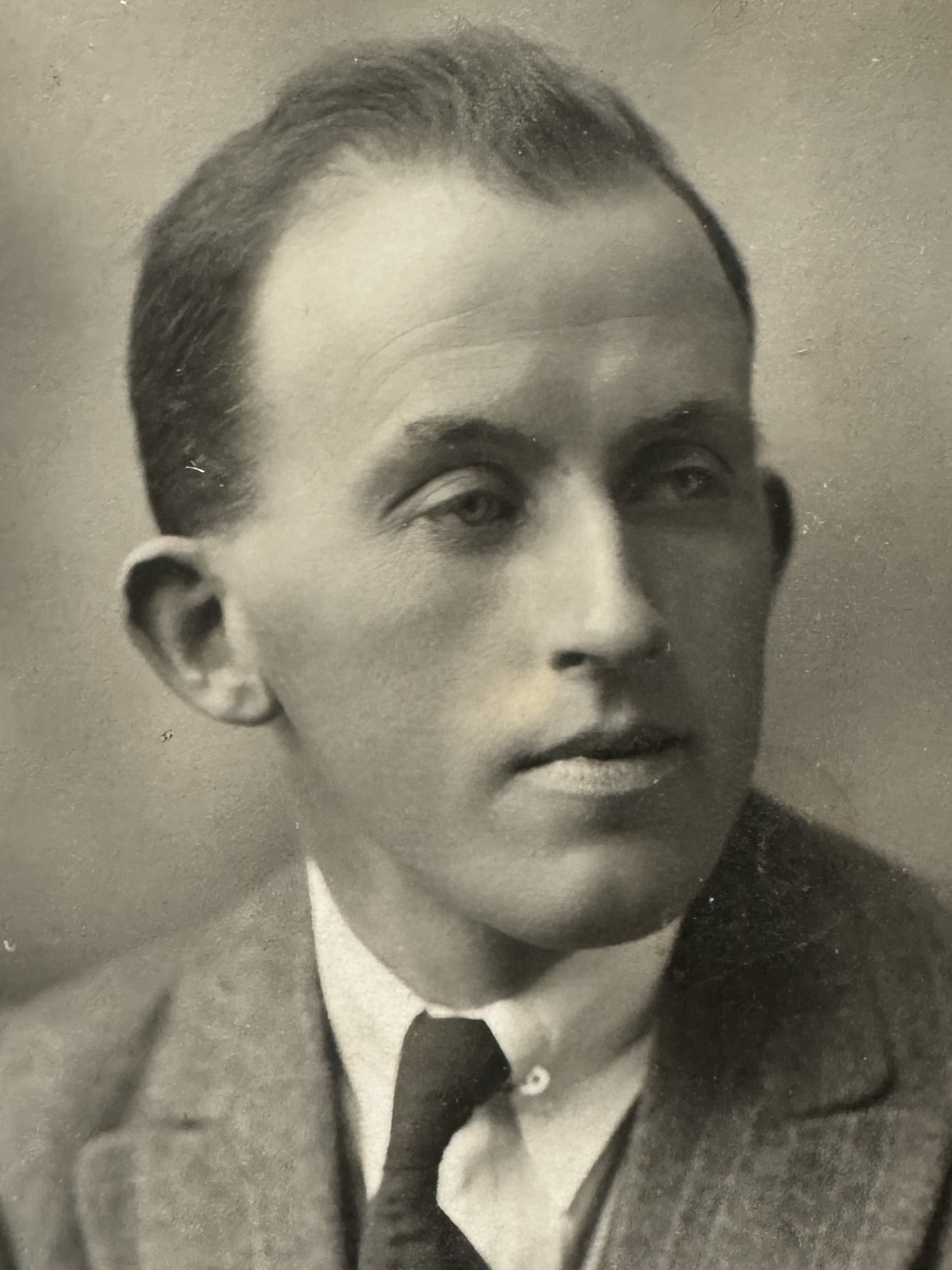
- McCurtin, c.1920s

Teachta Dála
- In office August 1923 – June 1927
- Constituency: Tipperary

Personal details
- Born: 24 June 1896 County Tipperary, Ireland
- Died: 12 November 1982 (aged 86) County Tipperary, Ireland
- Party: Cumann na nGaedheal

Seán Patrick McCurtin (24 June 1896 – 12 November 1982) was an Irish Cumann na nGaedheal politician and National Army officer from County Tipperary.

Active in the Irish War of Independence, McCurtin participated in many ambushes including the one at Modreeny on 3 June 1921. Shortly after the Truce he went north of the border to assist against the B-Specials. He was arrested and sentenced to ten years' imprisonment at Enniskillen assizes on 13 March 1922 for possession of firearms and ammunition, and transferred to Aberdeen prison in 1923. His brother Austin was a commandant in the National Army, killed during the Civil War in County Laois.

McCurtin was first elected to Dáil Éireann while in prison, as a Cumann na nGaedheal Teachta Dála (TD) for the Tipperary constituency at the 1923 general election. The Free State government regarded him as one of a number of political prisoners and demanded their release. The British government undertook to review their cases, and the Northern Ireland prime minister, Sir James Craig, agreed to accept the review's conclusions. McCurtin was released with 32 others on 25 January 1926, and took his seat in the Dáil on 23 March 1926.

McCurtin did not contest the June 1927 general election. He was an unsuccessful candidate at the 1932 and 1933 general elections. His later career was as a solicitor in Nenagh. An attempt was made in 1934 to kill his clerk Michael Flynn. McCurtin became state solicitor for the Division of Tipperary in September 1948.

Dáil	Election	Deputy (Party)	Deputy (Party)	Deputy (Party)	Deputy (Party)	Deputy (Party)	Deputy (Party)	Deputy (Party)
4th	1923	Dan Breen (Rep)	Séamus Burke (CnaG)	Louis Dalton (CnaG)	Daniel Morrissey (Lab)	Patrick Ryan (Rep)	Michael Heffernan (FP)	Seán McCurtin (CnaG)
5th	1927 (Jun)	Seán Hayes (FF)	Séamus Burke (CnaG)	John Hassett (CnaG)	Daniel Morrissey (Lab)	William O'Brien (Lab)	Michael Heffernan (FP)	Andrew Fogarty (FF)
6th	1927 (Sep)	Seán Hayes (FF)	Séamus Burke (CnaG)	John Hassett (CnaG)	Daniel Morrissey (Lab)	Timothy Sheehy (FF)	Michael Heffernan (FP)	Andrew Fogarty (FF)
7th	1932	Seán Hayes (FF)	Séamus Burke (CnaG)	John Hassett (CnaG)	Daniel Morrissey (Ind.)	Timothy Sheehy (FF)	Dan Breen (FF)	Andrew Fogarty (FF)
8th	1933	Seán Hayes (FF)	Séamus Burke (CnaG)	Richard Curran (NCP)	Daniel Morrissey (CnaG)	Martin Ryan (FF)	Dan Breen (FF)	Andrew Fogarty (FF)
9th	1937	William O'Brien (Lab)	Séamus Burke (FG)	Jeremiah Ryan (FG)	Daniel Morrissey (FG)	Martin Ryan (FF)	Dan Breen (FF)	Andrew Fogarty (FF)
10th	1938	Frank Loughman (FF)	Richard Curran (FG)	Jeremiah Ryan (FG)	Daniel Morrissey (FG)	Martin Ryan (FF)	Dan Breen (FF)	Andrew Fogarty (FF)
11th	1943	Richard Stapleton (Lab)	William O'Donnell (CnaT)	Jeremiah Ryan (FG)	Daniel Morrissey (FG)	Martin Ryan (FF)	Dan Breen (FF)	Andrew Fogarty (FF)
12th	1944	Frank Loughman (FF)	William O'Donnell (CnaT)	Richard Mulcahy (FG)	Daniel Morrissey (FG)	Mary Ryan (FF)	Dan Breen (FF)	Andrew Fogarty (FF)
12th	1947 by-election	Frank Loughman (FF)	Patrick Kinane (CnaP)	Richard Mulcahy (FG)	Daniel Morrissey (FG)	Mary Ryan (FF)	Dan Breen (FF)	Andrew Fogarty (FF)
13th	1948	Constituency abolished. See Tipperary North and Tipperary South						

Dáil	Election	Deputy (Party)	Deputy (Party)	Deputy (Party)	Deputy (Party)	Deputy (Party)
32nd	2016	Séamus Healy (WUA)	Alan Kelly (Lab)	Jackie Cahill (FF)	Michael Lowry (Ind.)	Mattie McGrath (Ind.)
33rd	2020	Martin Browne (SF)	Alan Kelly (Lab)	Jackie Cahill (FF)	Michael Lowry (Ind.)	Mattie McGrath (Ind.)
34th	2024	Constituency abolished. See Tipperary North and Tipperary South				
