= Mattie McGrath =

Irish politician (born 1958)

Mattie McGrath TD
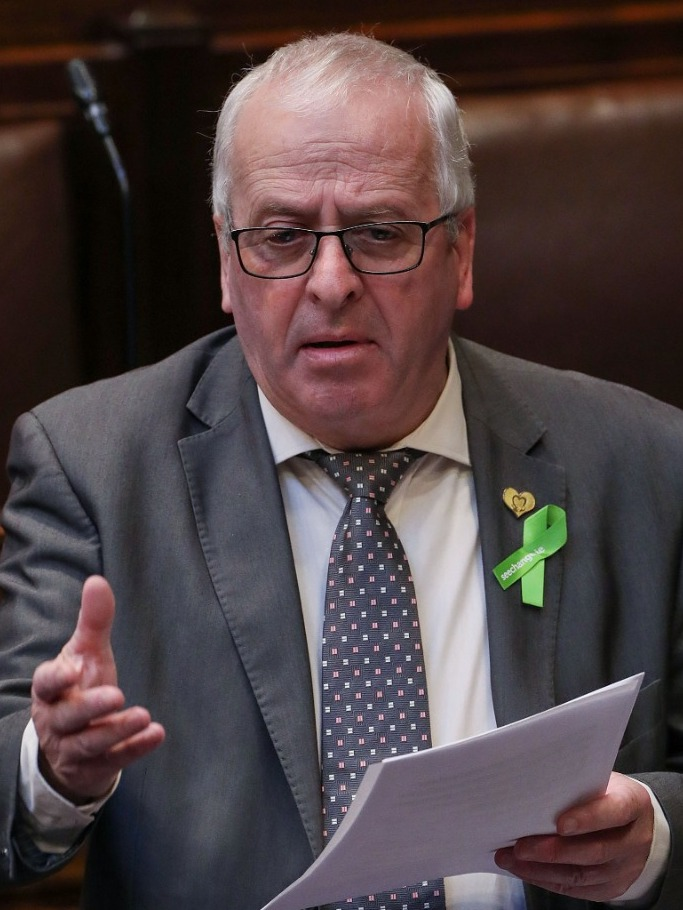
- McGrath in 2022

Teachta Dála
- Incumbent
- Assumed office November 2024
- In office May 2007 – February 2016
- Constituency: Tipperary South
- In office February 2016 – November 2024
- Constituency: Tipperary

South Tipperary County Councillor
- In office 1999–2007
- In office 1990–1991
- Constituency: Cahir

Personal details
- Born: Matthew McGrath; 1 September 1958 (age 67) Newcastle, County Tipperary, Ireland
- Party: Independent
- Other political affiliations: Fianna Fáil (until 2011)
- Spouse: Margaret Sherlock (m. 1987)
- Children: 8
- Education: University College Cork
- Website: mattiemcgrath.ie

Matthew McGrath (born 1 September 1958) is an Irish independent politician and a Teachta Dála (TD) for the Tipperary South constituency since the 2024 general election, and previously from 2007 to 2016. He was a TD for the Tipperary constituency from 2016 to 2024.

McGrath was first elected as a Fianna Fáil TD but he left the party in 2011 before the general election, and has contested elections as an independent candidate since.

== Education and political career ==
McGrath was educated at St. Joseph's College, Cahir; Kildalton Agricultural College, County Kilkenny and University College Cork.

=== Fianna Fáil ===
McGrath was a Fianna Fáil member of South Tipperary County Council from 1999 to 2007 and served as chairperson of the council from 2004 to 2005.

McGrath was first elected to the Dáil at the 2007 general election as a Fianna Fáil TD for Tipperary South.

McGrath was found not guilty of the assault of a teenager in south Tipperary following a trial in 2008. McGrath made a complaint to the Garda Ombudsman's office in relation to the handling of the investigation.

In October 2009, McGrath criticised the proposal by Noel Dempsey to lower the legal level of alcohol in drivers, claiming that for some people a small amount of alcohol made them less nervous behind the wheel, though he said he didn't condone drunk driving. His comments were criticised by Road Safety Authority chairman Gay Byrne and the Automobile Association.

In June 2010, McGrath accused Minister for the Environment, Heritage and Local Government John Gormley of the Green Party of bullying Fianna Fáil over the bill to ban stag hunting, which was passed in the Dáil on 29 June 2010. Gormley said the bill was a part of the renewed programme for government and that it was a relatively minor piece of legislation, which should not have taken up so much Dáil time. McGrath voted against the bill and lost the Fianna Fáil parliamentary party whip as a result. He explained he was independent minded and would not be silenced by anybody. He further qualified his support for the government in September 2010.

=== Independent ===
On 25 January 2011, McGrath announced that he was leaving the Fianna Fáil party and would contest the 2011 general election as an Independent candidate. He denied that he was cynically resigning from the party in an attempt to save his own Dáil seat, saying that he had run out of "final straws" with Fianna Fáil. He also said that widespread unemployment, pay cuts, negative equity, the recent price hike at health insurer VHI and the recent leadership debacle had forced his hand.

At the election on 25 February, McGrath secured his seat on the fifth count, having polled 14.7 per cent of the first preference vote. He was a member of the Rural Independents Technical group in the Dáil.

In 2015, McGrath was accused of plagiarising a speech he gave in the Dáil on ISIS from a resolution put forward by American Congressman Jeff Fortenberry. McGrath denied the claims.

McGrath was re-elected in the newly formed Tipperary constituency in 2016, receiving 11,237 first preference votes (14.4%). He was again re-elected in 2020, with 9,321 first preference votes (11.4%).

At the 2024 general election, McGrath was re-elected to the Dáil. In January 2025 he joined the Regional Independent Group in the Dáil. Ceann Comhairle, Verona Murphy subsequently ruled that four members of the group who supported the coalition government could not avail of opposition speaking rights. McGrath was critical of the decision, describing it as "anti-democratic and totally wrong".

Elections to the Dáil
Party	Election		FPv	FPv%	Result
Fianna Fáil	Tipperary South	2007	7,608	19.6	Elected on count 6/8
Independent	Tipperary South	2011	6,074	14.7	Elected on count 5/5
Independent	Tipperary	2016	11,237	14.4	Elected on count 4/7
Independent	Tipperary	2020	9,321	11.4	Elected on count 8/9
Independent	Tipperary South	2024	10,014	24.4	Elected on count 2/6

== Political views ==
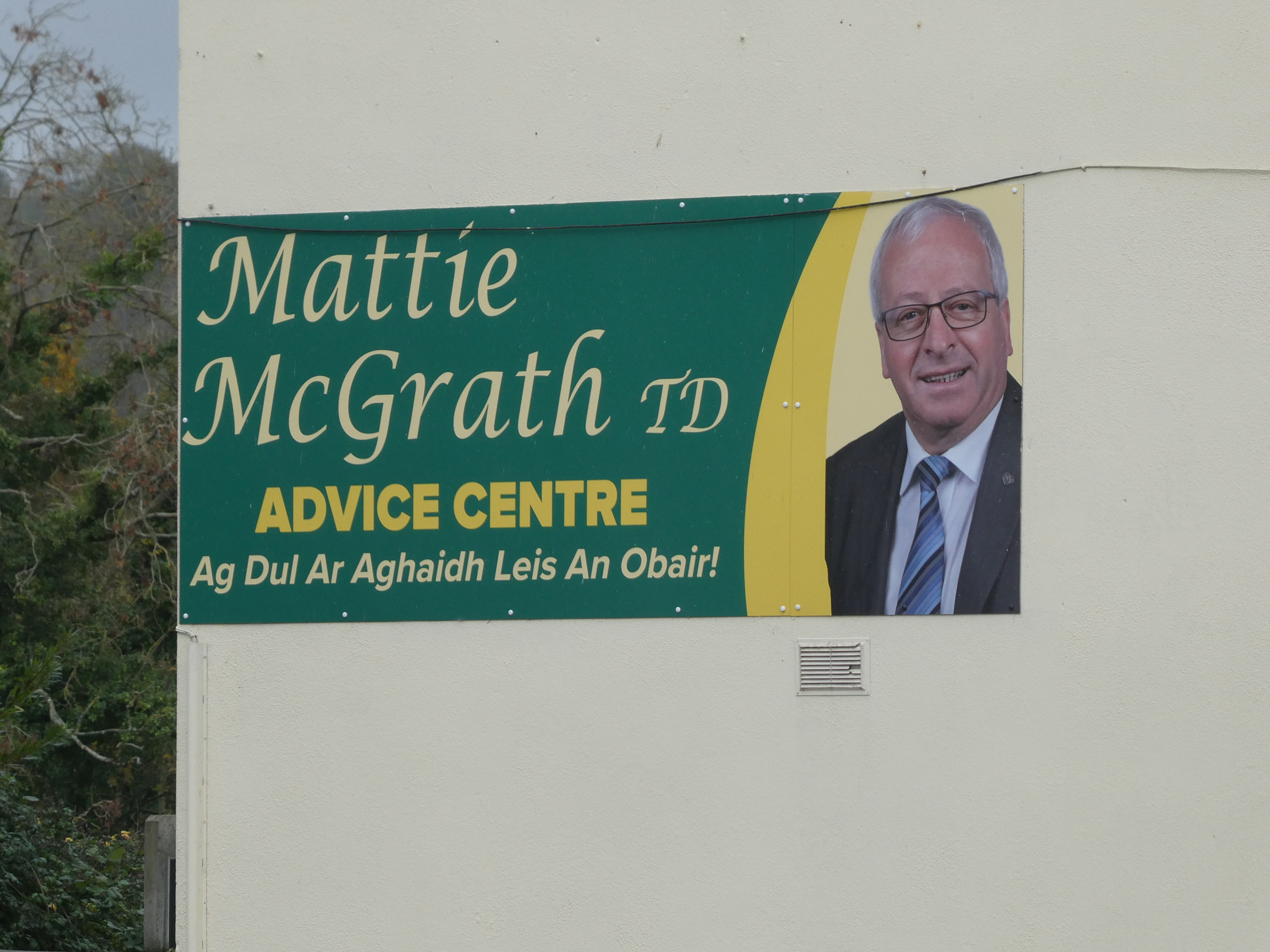
Constituency office in Clonmel

McGrath is opposed to same-sex marriage, and was the only TD to speak against it in the Irish same-sex marriage referendum when it was debated in the Dáil. He said he would “probably” vote No in the referendum to allow same sex couples to marry in 2015.

McGrath is an anti-abortion advocate. He supported the "No" side in the 2018 abortion referendum. In November 2018 he supported amendments to the Regulation of Termination of Pregnancy Bill which would require pain relief to the foetus during termination, which were subsequently defeated. McGrath has met the Pope in the Vatican on numerous occasions, including one day prior to the 2018 visit by Pope Francis to Ireland for the World Meeting of Families. McGrath was highly critical of former President of Ireland Mary McAleese prior to the Pope's visit saying "obviously the lady has issues" and that people are "getting sick and tired" of the former president "hogging the airwaves." McAleese had been critical of the Catholic Church in the run up to the Papal visit.

McGrath opposed a minute of silence being held in the Dáil after the murder of George Floyd, saying that it was "none of our business" and calling it "showboating nonsense".

== Controversies ==
=== Comments on COVID-19 and criticism ===
McGrath has attracted criticism from various politicians and from the Auschwitz Museum for his comments on COVID-19 and perceived sensationalist remarks by drawing comparisons between life in Nazi Germany and COVID-19 restrictions in Ireland. McGrath has referred to the pandemic as a "scamdemic" and has opposed public health lockdowns, declaring that "this wouldn't happen under Hitler".

McGrath has said that he will not be receiving a COVID-19 vaccine. When asked if he had received a COVID-19 vaccination, McGrath refused to answer, replying "My body, my choice" and comparing the vaccine regime to "1930s Nazi Germany".

On 28 April 2021, during the COVID-19 pandemic, McGrath said in the Dáil that COVID restrictions were returning to “Nazi Hitler's time”. Taoiseach Micheál Martin called the remarks “contemptible and disgraceful” and asked McGrath to withdraw them but McGrath refused. McGrath also accused the Taoiseach of making an "apartheid" decision by not allowing indoor dining, for which the Taoiseach accused him of holding a Trumpian view in denying the existence of the pandemic.

In July 2021, McGrath compared the concept of digital COVID-19 certificates to Germany during Nazi times, and the practice of giving badges to concentration camp prisoners during the Holocaust, stating "Is that what we have come to now. Are we back to 1933 in Germany? We'll be all tagged in the yellow and the mark of the beast will be on us". McGrath was criticised by the Auschwitz Museum for these remarks, with the museum inviting him to read about the Holocaust and describing his remarks as "a sad symptom of moral and intellectual decline". McGrath was also criticised by Social Democrats TD Jennifer Whitmore for his comments. McGrath doubled down and told the Irish Examiner reporter Aoife Moore "There are huge correlations, it's exactly the same if you want to study it, exactly the same"; an editorial in the paper called McGrath an "Intolerable idiot".

McGrath compared the extension of COVID emergency powers to apartheid on the 5 October 2021. He was criticised by Foreign Affairs Minister Simon Coveney TD and Paul Murphy TD, with Murphy calling the remarks "non-acceptable".

=== Comments on Tony Holohan ===
In October 2020, McGrath made comments at a media briefing, asking where Ireland's Chief Medical Officer Tony Holohan "had been in the last few months", during which Holohan had been caring for his wife Emer, who had terminal cancer and was receiving palliative care. McGrath's remarks were branded as "shameful" by Fine Gael's Ciarán Cannon, who demanded he withdraw and apologise for his remarks. McGrath withdrew these remarks and offered his apologies for them.

=== Comments on refugees ===
In June 2022, McGrath was criticised for saying on Today with Claire Byrne that he would like a cap on the number of refugees. He was criticized by Paul McAuliffe TD, who said "Mattie is trying to pretend that the Government doesn't care about the Irish people. There are women and children in refugee tents in Poland. We are not prepared to leave people there." Senator Garret Ahearn condemned "the reckless comments by Mattie McGrath" and said they were a disgrace.

=== Far-right influences ===
In December 2022, McGrath was accused of spreading far-right rhetoric in the Dáil by Tánaiste Micheál Martin. Martin claimed that "far-right ideologues" were influencing groups in the Dáil and that McGrath "had a script" prepared for him that alluded to conspiracy theories such as "the Great Reset".

==== 2023 Dublin riot ====
On 29 November 2023, in the aftermath of a riot the previous week, Paul Murphy criticised other TDs for laundering far-right conspiracy theories. Mattie McGrath was specifically named.

==== Comments on autism and criticism ====
On 9 May 2024 during a debate on special education McGrath said there "must be a need for understanding the explosion of autism". He claimed that his brother, who had worked as a paediatrician in Africa in the 1990s had not heard the word until he returned to Ireland. Adam Harris, of the autism advocacy group AsIAm said on X:"Is it any wonder the stigma that Autistic people suffer when such dangerous misinformation is spouted in the Dáil? Never mind explaining the right language or facts but dog whistling to conspiracy theorists at Autistic people's expense is below the belt".

Senator Martin Conway said on X:"For the record, @mattiemcgrathtd, you did not see children with difference in school because they were not allowed to attend or be part of society," and added "People like me were sent to school in Dublin hidden away, people like Adam sent to institutions. We all existed but were locked out". Anne Rabbitte said she was"really disappointed to hear any Deputy use their Dáil time to spout such language. It is actually dangerous and needs to be called out".

Dáil	Election	Deputy (Party)	Deputy (Party)	Deputy (Party)	Deputy (Party)
13th	1948	Michael Davern (FF)	Richard Mulcahy (FG)	Dan Breen (FF)	John Timoney (CnaP)
14th	1951	Michael Davern (FF)	Richard Mulcahy (FG)	Dan Breen (FF)	Patrick Crowe (FG)
15th	1954	Michael Davern (FF)	Richard Mulcahy (FG)	Dan Breen (FF)	Patrick Crowe (FG)
16th	1957	Michael Davern (FF)	Richard Mulcahy (FG)	Dan Breen (FF)	Frank Loughman (FF)
17th	1961	Michael Davern (FF)	Patrick Hogan (FG)	Dan Breen (FF)	Seán Treacy (Note: Treacy served as Ceann Comhairle in the 20th Dáil from 1973 to 1977, and was returned automatically at the 1977 election. He lost the Labour party whip in February 1985.) (Lab)
18th	1965	Don Davern (FF)	Patrick Hogan (FG)	Jackie Fahey (FF)	Seán Treacy (Lab)
19th	1969	Noel Davern (FF)	Patrick Hogan (FG)	Jackie Fahey (FF)	Seán Treacy (Lab)
20th	1973	Noel Davern (FF)	Brendan Griffin (FG)	Jackie Fahey (FF)	Seán Treacy (Lab)
21st	1977	Noel Davern (FF)	Brendan Griffin (FG)	3 seats 1977–1981	Seán Treacy (Lab)
22nd	1981	Carrie Acheson (FF)	Brendan Griffin (FG)	Seán McCarthy (FF)	Seán Treacy (Lab)
23rd	1982 (Feb)	Seán Byrne (FF)	Brendan Griffin (FG)	Seán McCarthy (FF)	Seán Treacy (Lab)
24th	1982 (Nov)	Seán Byrne (FF)	Brendan Griffin (FG)	Seán McCarthy (FF)	Seán Treacy (Lab)
25th	1987	Noel Davern (FF)	Brendan Griffin (FG)	Seán McCarthy (FF)	Seán Treacy (Note: Treacy served as Ceann Comhairle in the 25th, 26th and 27th Dáil from 1987 to 1997, and was returned automatically at the 1989 and 1992 elections.) (Ind.)
26th	1989	Noel Davern (FF)	Theresa Ahearn (FG)	Michael Ferris (Lab)	Seán Treacy (Ind.)
27th	1992	Noel Davern (FF)	Theresa Ahearn (FG)	Michael Ferris (Lab)	Seán Treacy (Ind.)
28th	1997	Noel Davern (FF)	Theresa Ahearn (FG)	Michael Ferris (Lab)	3 seats from 1997
28th	2000 by-election	Noel Davern (FF)	Theresa Ahearn (FG)	Séamus Healy (Ind.)	3 seats from 1997
28th	2001 by-election	Noel Davern (FF)	Tom Hayes (FG)	Séamus Healy (Ind.)	3 seats from 1997
29th	2002	Noel Davern (FF)	Tom Hayes (FG)	Séamus Healy (Ind.)	3 seats from 1997
30th	2007	Mattie McGrath (FF)	Tom Hayes (FG)	Martin Mansergh (FF)	3 seats from 1997
31st	2011	Mattie McGrath (Ind.)	Tom Hayes (FG)	Séamus Healy (WUA)	3 seats from 1997
32nd	2016	Constituency abolished. See Tipperary			

Dáil	Election	Deputy (Party)	Deputy (Party)	Deputy (Party)
34th	2024	Mattie McGrath (Ind.)	Michael Murphy (FG)	Séamus Healy (Ind.)

Dáil	Election	Deputy (Party)	Deputy (Party)	Deputy (Party)	Deputy (Party)	Deputy (Party)	Deputy (Party)	Deputy (Party)
4th	1923	Dan Breen (Rep)	Séamus Burke (CnaG)	Louis Dalton (CnaG)	Daniel Morrissey (Lab)	Patrick Ryan (Rep)	Michael Heffernan (FP)	Seán McCurtin (CnaG)
5th	1927 (Jun)	Seán Hayes (FF)	Séamus Burke (CnaG)	John Hassett (CnaG)	Daniel Morrissey (Lab)	William O'Brien (Lab)	Michael Heffernan (FP)	Andrew Fogarty (FF)
6th	1927 (Sep)	Seán Hayes (FF)	Séamus Burke (CnaG)	John Hassett (CnaG)	Daniel Morrissey (Lab)	Timothy Sheehy (FF)	Michael Heffernan (FP)	Andrew Fogarty (FF)
7th	1932	Seán Hayes (FF)	Séamus Burke (CnaG)	John Hassett (CnaG)	Daniel Morrissey (Ind.)	Timothy Sheehy (FF)	Dan Breen (FF)	Andrew Fogarty (FF)
8th	1933	Seán Hayes (FF)	Séamus Burke (CnaG)	Richard Curran (NCP)	Daniel Morrissey (CnaG)	Martin Ryan (FF)	Dan Breen (FF)	Andrew Fogarty (FF)
9th	1937	William O'Brien (Lab)	Séamus Burke (FG)	Jeremiah Ryan (FG)	Daniel Morrissey (FG)	Martin Ryan (FF)	Dan Breen (FF)	Andrew Fogarty (FF)
10th	1938	Frank Loughman (FF)	Richard Curran (FG)	Jeremiah Ryan (FG)	Daniel Morrissey (FG)	Martin Ryan (FF)	Dan Breen (FF)	Andrew Fogarty (FF)
11th	1943	Richard Stapleton (Lab)	William O'Donnell (CnaT)	Jeremiah Ryan (FG)	Daniel Morrissey (FG)	Martin Ryan (FF)	Dan Breen (FF)	Andrew Fogarty (FF)
12th	1944	Frank Loughman (FF)	William O'Donnell (CnaT)	Richard Mulcahy (FG)	Daniel Morrissey (FG)	Mary Ryan (FF)	Dan Breen (FF)	Andrew Fogarty (FF)
12th	1947 by-election	Frank Loughman (FF)	Patrick Kinane (CnaP)	Richard Mulcahy (FG)	Daniel Morrissey (FG)	Mary Ryan (FF)	Dan Breen (FF)	Andrew Fogarty (FF)
13th	1948	Constituency abolished. See Tipperary North and Tipperary South						

Dáil	Election	Deputy (Party)	Deputy (Party)	Deputy (Party)	Deputy (Party)	Deputy (Party)
32nd	2016	Séamus Healy (WUA)	Alan Kelly (Lab)	Jackie Cahill (FF)	Michael Lowry (Ind.)	Mattie McGrath (Ind.)
33rd	2020	Martin Browne (SF)	Alan Kelly (Lab)	Jackie Cahill (FF)	Michael Lowry (Ind.)	Mattie McGrath (Ind.)
34th	2024	Constituency abolished. See Tipperary North and Tipperary South				
