= Jeremiah Ryan =

Irish politician (1891–1960)

Senator
- In office 21 April 1948 – 14 August 1951
- Constituency: Administrative Panel

Teachta Dála
- In office July 1937 – May 1944
- Constituency: Tipperary

Personal details
- Born: 30 July 1891 County Tipperary, Ireland
- Died: 3 March 1960 (aged 68) County Tipperary, Ireland
- Party: Fine Gael

Jeremiah Ryan (30 July 1891 – 3 March 1960) was an Irish Fine Gael politician. He served as the vice-commandant of the mid-Tipperary bridge of the Irish Republican Army (IRA).

A farmer, he was elected to Dáil Éireann as a Teachta Dála (TD) for the Tipperary constituency at the 1937 general election. He was re-elected at the 1938 and 1943 general elections. He did not contest the 1944 general election. He was elected to the 6th Seanad on the Administrative Panel in 1948.

| Dáil | Election | Deputy (Party) | Deputy (Party) | Deputy (Party) | Deputy (Party) | Deputy (Party) | Deputy (Party) | Deputy (Party) |
|---|---|---|---|---|---|---|---|---|
| 4th | 1923 | Dan Breen (Rep) | Séamus Burke (CnaG) | Louis Dalton (CnaG) | Daniel Morrissey (Lab) | Patrick Ryan (Rep) | Michael Heffernan (FP) | Seán McCurtin (CnaG) |
| 5th | 1927 (Jun) | Seán Hayes (FF) | Séamus Burke (CnaG) | John Hassett (CnaG) | Daniel Morrissey (Lab) | William O'Brien (Lab) | Michael Heffernan (FP) | Andrew Fogarty (FF) |
| 6th | 1927 (Sep) | Seán Hayes (FF) | Séamus Burke (CnaG) | John Hassett (CnaG) | Daniel Morrissey (Lab) | Timothy Sheehy (FF) | Michael Heffernan (FP) | Andrew Fogarty (FF) |
| 7th | 1932 | Seán Hayes (FF) | Séamus Burke (CnaG) | John Hassett (CnaG) | Daniel Morrissey (Ind.) | Timothy Sheehy (FF) | Dan Breen (FF) | Andrew Fogarty (FF) |
| 8th | 1933 | Seán Hayes (FF) | Séamus Burke (CnaG) | Richard Curran (NCP) | Daniel Morrissey (CnaG) | Martin Ryan (FF) | Dan Breen (FF) | Andrew Fogarty (FF) |
| 9th | 1937 | William O'Brien (Lab) | Séamus Burke (FG) | Jeremiah Ryan (FG) | Daniel Morrissey (FG) | Martin Ryan (FF) | Dan Breen (FF) | Andrew Fogarty (FF) |
| 10th | 1938 | Frank Loughman (FF) | Richard Curran (FG) | Jeremiah Ryan (FG) | Daniel Morrissey (FG) | Martin Ryan (FF) | Dan Breen (FF) | Andrew Fogarty (FF) |
| 11th | 1943 | Richard Stapleton (Lab) | William O'Donnell (CnaT) | Jeremiah Ryan (FG) | Daniel Morrissey (FG) | Martin Ryan (FF) | Dan Breen (FF) | Andrew Fogarty (FF) |
| 12th | 1944 | Frank Loughman (FF) | William O'Donnell (CnaT) | Richard Mulcahy (FG) | Daniel Morrissey (FG) | Mary Ryan (FF) | Dan Breen (FF) | Andrew Fogarty (FF) |
| 12th | 1947 by-election | Frank Loughman (FF) | Patrick Kinane (CnaP) | Richard Mulcahy (FG) | Daniel Morrissey (FG) | Mary Ryan (FF) | Dan Breen (FF) | Andrew Fogarty (FF) |
| 13th | 1948 | Constituency abolished. See Tipperary North and Tipperary South | | | | | | |

| Dáil | Election | Deputy (Party) | Deputy (Party) | Deputy (Party) | Deputy (Party) | Deputy (Party) |
|---|---|---|---|---|---|---|
| 32nd | 2016 | Séamus Healy (WUA) | Alan Kelly (Lab) | Jackie Cahill (FF) | Michael Lowry (Ind.) | Mattie McGrath (Ind.) |
| 33rd | 2020 | Martin Browne (SF) | Alan Kelly (Lab) | Jackie Cahill (FF) | Michael Lowry (Ind.) | Mattie McGrath (Ind.) |
| 34th | 2024 | Constituency abolished. See Tipperary North and Tipperary South | | | | |
