= 10th Dáil =

TDs from 1938 to 1943

←	9th Dáil	11th Dáil	→

Overview
- Legislative body: Dáil Éireann
- Jurisdiction: Ireland
- Meeting place: Leinster House
- Term: 30 June 1938 – 26 June 1943
- Election: 1938 general election
- Government: 2nd government of Ireland
- Members: 138
- Ceann Comhairle: Frank Fahy
- Taoiseach: Éamon de Valera
- Tánaiste: Seán T. O'Kelly
- Chief Whip: Paddy Smith — Patrick Little until 26 September 1939
- Leader of the Opposition: W. T. Cosgrave

Sessions
- 1st: 30 June 1938 – 21 July 1938
- 2nd: 26 October 1938 – 1 August 1939
- 3rd: 2 September 1939 – 7 August 1940
- 4th: 2 October 1940 – 24 July 1941
- 5th: 17 September 1941 – 17 July 1942
- 6th: 14 October 1942 – 26 May 1943

The 10th Dáil was elected at the 1938 general election on 17 June 1938 and first met on 30 June 1938. The members of Dáil Éireann, the House of Representatives of the Oireachtas (legislature) of Ireland, are known as TDs. It sat with the 3rd Seanad as the two Houses of the Oireachtas.

The 10th Dáil is the longest serving Dáil, lasting 4 years, 361 days. The Dáil adjourned on 26 May 1943 and on 31 May President Douglas Hyde called a general election for 17 June at the request of the Taoiseach Éamon de Valera. Exceptionally, the outgoing Dáil was not dissolved until 26 June, after the election. Although the Constitution requires the President to dissolve the Dáil before a general election, this procedure was overridden by the General Elections (Emergency Provisions) Act 1943. The act, which would have been unconstitutional under Article 16.3.2° if not for the state of emergency in effect under Article 28.3.3° during World War II, was intended to increase national security by minimising the interval during which no Dáil was in existence.

== Composition of the 10th Dáil ==
- 3rd government

Party	June 1938	June 1943	Change
Fianna Fáil	77	72	▼5
Fine Gael	45	41	▼4
Labour	9	9	Steady
Independent	7	8	▲1
Ceann Comhairle	—N/a	1	▲1
Vacant	—N/a	7	▲7
Total	138		

=== Graphical representation ===
This is a graphical comparison of party strengths in the 10th Dáil from June 1938. This was not the official seating plan.

== Ceann Comhairle ==
On 30 June 1938, Frank Fahy (FF), who had served as Ceann Comhairle since 1932, was proposed by Éamon de Valera and seconded by Donnchadh Ó Briain for the position, and was elected without a vote.

== TDs by constituency ==
The 138 TDs elected at the 1938 general election are listed by Dáil constituency.

Members of the 10th Dáil
Constituency	Name	Party
Athlone–Longford	Erskine H. Childers	Fianna Fáil
Athlone–Longford	Seán Mac Eoin	Fine Gael
Athlone–Longford	James Victory	Fianna Fáil
Carlow–Kildare	Thomas Harris	Fianna Fáil
Carlow–Kildare	James Hughes	Fine Gael
Carlow–Kildare	Francis Humphreys	Fianna Fáil
Carlow–Kildare	William Norton	Labour
Cavan	John James Cole	Independent
Cavan	Patrick McGovern	Fine Gael
Cavan	Michael Sheridan	Fianna Fáil
Cavan	Paddy Smith	Fianna Fáil
Clare	Patrick Burke	Fine Gael
Clare	Thomas Burke	Independent
Clare	Éamon de Valera	Fianna Fáil
Clare	Seán O'Grady	Fianna Fáil
Clare	Peter O'Loghlen	Fianna Fáil
Cork Borough	W. T. Cosgrave	Fine Gael
Cork Borough	Thomas Dowdall	Fianna Fáil
Cork Borough	Hugo Flinn	Fianna Fáil
Cork Borough	James Hickey	Labour
Cork North	Patrick Daly	Fine Gael
Cork North	Timothy Linehan	Fine Gael
Cork North	Con Meaney	Fianna Fáil
Cork North	Seán Moylan	Fianna Fáil
Cork South-East	Brook Brasier	Fine Gael
Cork South-East	Martin Corry	Fianna Fáil
Cork South-East	Jeremiah Hurley	Labour
Cork West	Seán Buckley	Fianna Fáil
Cork West	Timothy J. Murphy	Labour
Cork West	Timothy O'Donovan	Fine Gael
Cork West	Eamonn O'Neill	Fine Gael
Cork West	Timothy O'Sullivan	Fianna Fáil
Donegal East	John Friel	Fianna Fáil
Donegal East	Henry McDevitt	Fianna Fáil
Donegal East	Daniel McMenamin	Fine Gael
Donegal East	James Myles	Independent
Donegal West	Brian Brady	Fianna Fáil
Donegal West	Cormac Breslin	Fianna Fáil
Donegal West	Michael Óg McFadden	Fine Gael
Dublin South	James Beckett	Fine Gael
Dublin South	Robert Briscoe	Fianna Fáil
Dublin South	Peadar Doyle	Fine Gael
Dublin South	Joseph Hannigan	Independent
Dublin South	Seán Lemass	Fianna Fáil
Dublin South	James Lynch	Fianna Fáil
Dublin South	Thomas Kelly	Fianna Fáil
Dublin County	Patrick Belton	Fine Gael
Dublin County	Seán Brady	Fianna Fáil
Dublin County	Patrick Fogarty	Fianna Fáil
Dublin County	Henry Dockrell	Fine Gael
Dublin County	Thomas Mullen	Fianna Fáil
Dublin North-East	Alfie Byrne	Independent
Dublin North-East	Richard Mulcahy	Fine Gael
Dublin North-East	Oscar Traynor	Fianna Fáil
Dublin North-West	Cormac Breathnach	Fianna Fáil
Dublin North-West	A. P. Byrne	Independent
Dublin North-West	Eamonn Cooney	Fianna Fáil
Dublin North-West	Patrick McGilligan	Fine Gael
Dublin North-West	Seán T. O'Kelly	Fianna Fáil
Dublin Townships	Ernest Benson	Fine Gael
Dublin Townships	John A. Costello	Fine Gael
Dublin Townships	Seán MacEntee	Fianna Fáil
Galway East	Patrick Beegan	Fianna Fáil
Galway East	Seán Broderick	Fine Gael
Galway East	Frank Fahy	Fianna Fáil
Galway East	Mark Killilea Snr	Fianna Fáil
Galway West	Gerald Bartley	Fianna Fáil
Galway West	Joseph Mongan	Fine Gael
Galway West	Seán Tubridy	Fianna Fáil
Kerry North	Stephen Fuller	Fianna Fáil
Kerry North	Eamon Kissane	Fianna Fáil
Kerry North	Tom McEllistrim	Fianna Fáil
Kerry North	John O'Sullivan	Fine Gael
Kerry South	Frederick Crowley	Fianna Fáil
Kerry South	John Flynn	Fianna Fáil
Kerry South	Fionán Lynch	Fine Gael
Kilkenny	Denis Gorey	Fine Gael
Kilkenny	Thomas Derrig	Fianna Fáil
Kilkenny	James Pattison	Labour
Leitrim	Stephen Flynn	Fianna Fáil
Leitrim	Bernard Maguire	Fianna Fáil
Leitrim	Mary Reynolds	Fine Gael
Leix–Offaly	Patrick Boland	Fianna Fáil
Leix–Offaly	William Davin	Labour
Leix–Offaly	Patrick Gorry	Fianna Fáil
Leix–Offaly	Daniel Hogan	Fianna Fáil
Leix–Offaly	Thomas F. O'Higgins	Fine Gael
Limerick	George C. Bennett	Fine Gael
Limerick	Daniel Bourke	Fianna Fáil
Limerick	Tadhg Crowley	Fianna Fáil
Limerick	Michael Keyes	Labour
Limerick	Donnchadh Ó Briain	Fianna Fáil
Limerick	James Reidy	Fine Gael
Limerick	Robert Ryan	Fianna Fáil
Louth	Frank Aiken	Fianna Fáil
Louth	James Coburn	Fine Gael
Louth	Laurence Walsh	Fianna Fáil
Mayo North	Patrick Browne	Fine Gael
Mayo North	John Munnelly	Fianna Fáil
Mayo North	P. J. Ruttledge	Fianna Fáil
Mayo South	Micheál Clery	Fianna Fáil
Mayo South	James FitzGerald-Kenney	Fine Gael
Mayo South	Martin Nally	Fine Gael
Mayo South	Mícheál Ó Móráin	Fianna Fáil
Mayo South	Richard Walsh	Fianna Fáil
Meath–Westmeath	Charles Fagan	Fine Gael
Meath–Westmeath	Patrick Giles	Fine Gael
Meath–Westmeath	James Kelly	Fianna Fáil
Meath–Westmeath	Michael Kennedy	Fianna Fáil
Meath–Westmeath	Matthew O'Reilly	Fianna Fáil
Monaghan	James Dillon	Fine Gael
Monaghan	Bridget Rice	Fianna Fáil
Monaghan	Conn Ward	Fianna Fáil
Roscommon	Michael Brennan	Fine Gael
Roscommon	Gerald Boland	Fianna Fáil
Roscommon	Daniel O'Rourke	Fianna Fáil
Sligo	Martin Brennan	Fianna Fáil
Sligo	Frank Carty	Fianna Fáil
Sligo	Patrick Rogers	Fine Gael
Tipperary	Dan Breen	Fianna Fáil
Tipperary	Richard Curran	Fine Gael
Tipperary	Andrew Fogarty	Fianna Fáil
Tipperary	Frank Loughman	Fianna Fáil
Tipperary	Daniel Morrissey	Fine Gael
Tipperary	Jeremiah Ryan	Fine Gael
Tipperary	Martin Ryan	Fianna Fáil
Waterford	William Broderick	Fine Gael
Waterford	Patrick Little	Fianna Fáil
Waterford	Michael Morrissey	Fianna Fáil
Waterford	Bridget Redmond	Fine Gael
Wexford	Denis Allen	Fianna Fáil
Wexford	Richard Corish	Labour
Wexford	John Esmonde	Fine Gael
Wexford	John Keating	Fine Gael
Wexford	James Ryan	Fianna Fáil
Wicklow	Patrick Cogan	Independent
Wicklow	James Everett	Labour
Wicklow	Séamus Moore	Fianna Fáil

== Changes ==
Due to difficulties holding by-elections during the Emergency, no further by-elections were held to fill vacancies after the 1940 Galway West by-election.

Date	Constituency	Loss	Gain	Note
30 June 1938	Galway East	Fianna Fáil	Ceann Comhairle	Frank Fahy takes office as Ceann Comhairle
19 December 1938	Dublin South	Fine Gael		Death of James Beckett
6 June 1939	Dublin South		Fianna Fáil	John McCann wins the seat vacated by the death of Beckett
15 July 1939	Galway West	Fianna Fáil		Death of Seán Tubridy
1939	Dublin South	Independent	Labour	Joseph Hannigan joins Labour
20 February 1940	Kilkenny	Fine Gael		Death of Denis Gorey
30 May 1940	Galway West		Fianna Fáil	John J. Keane holds the seat vacated by the death of Tubridy
14 June 1940	Wicklow	Fianna Fáil		Death of Séamus Moore
31 August 1940	Cork South-East	Fine Gael		Death of Brook Brasier
18 October 1941	Mayo North	Fianna Fáil		Death of John Munnelly
7 April 1942	Cork Borough	Fianna Fáil		Death of Thomas Dowdall
20 April 1942	Dublin South	Fianna Fáil		Death of Thomas Kelly
10 September 1942	Sligo	Fianna Fáil		Death of Frank Carty
1942	Monaghan	Fine Gael	Independent	James Dillon resigns from party in opposition to Irish neutrality in World War II
28 January 1943	Cork Borough	Fianna Fáil		Death of Hugo Flinn
2 February 1943	Cork South-East	Labour		Death of Jeremiah Hurley
