= 11th Dáil =

TDs from 1943 to 1944

←	10th Dáil	12th Dáil	→

Overview
- Legislative body: Dáil Éireann
- Jurisdiction: Ireland
- Meeting place: Leinster House
- Term: 1 July 1943 – 7 June 1944
- Election: 1943 general election
- Government: 3rd government of Ireland
- Members: 138
- Ceann Comhairle: Frank Fahy
- Taoiseach: Éamon de Valera
- Tánaiste: Seán T. O'Kelly
- Chief Whip: Eamon Kissane — Paddy Smith until 2 July 1943
- Leader of the Opposition: Thomas F. O'Higgins — W. T. Cosgrave until January 1944

Sessions
- 1st: 1 July 1943 – 9 July 1943
- 2nd: 20 October 1943 – 10 May 1944

The 11th Dáil was elected at the 1943 general election on 23 June 1943 and met on 1 July 1943. The members of Dáil Éireann, the House of Representatives of the Oireachtas (legislature) of Ireland, are known as TDs. It sat with the 4th Seanad as the two Houses of the Oireachtas.

The Dáil adjourned sine die on 10 May 1944, the day after President Douglas Hyde called a general election for 30 May at the request of the Taoiseach Éamon de Valera. The 11th Dáil was dissolved on 7 June 1944. Exceptionally, the outgoing Dáil was not dissolved until after the election. Although the Constitution requires the President to dissolve the Dáil before a general election, this procedure was overridden by the General Elections (Emergency Provisions) Act 1943. The act, which would have been unconstitutional under Article 16.3.2° if not for the state of emergency in effect under Article 28.3.3° during the Second World War, was intended to increase national security by minimising the interval during which no Dáil was in existence. The 11th Dáil lasted 342 days.

There were no by-elections during this Dáil.

== Composition of the 11th Dáil ==
- 3rd government

Party	June 1943	May 1944	Change
Fianna Fáil	67	65	▼2
Fine Gael	32	32	Steady
Labour	17	12	▼5
Clann na Talmhan	14	13	▼1
Monetary Reform	1	1	Steady
National Labour	—N/a	5	▲5
Independent	7	8	▲1
Ceann Comhairle	—N/a	1	▲1
Vacant	—N/a	1	▲1
Total	138		

=== Graphical representation ===
This is a graphical comparison of party strengths in the 11th Dáil from July 1943. This was not the official seating plan.

== Ceann Comhairle ==
On 1 July 1943, Frank Fahy (FF), who had served as Ceann Comhairle since 1932, was proposed by Éamon de Valera and seconded by Seán T. O'Kelly for the position, and was elected without a vote.

== TDs by constituency ==
The 138 TDs elected at the 1943 general election are listed by Dáil constituency.

Members of the 11th Dáil
Constituency	Name	Party
Athlone–Longford	Thomas Carter	Fianna Fáil
Athlone–Longford	Erskine H. Childers	Fianna Fáil
Athlone–Longford	Seán Mac Eoin	Fine Gael
Carlow–Kildare	Thomas Harris	Fianna Fáil
Carlow–Kildare	James Hughes	Fine Gael
Carlow–Kildare	Francis Humphreys	Fianna Fáil
Carlow–Kildare	William Norton	Labour
Cavan	John James Cole	Independent
Cavan	Patrick O'Reilly	Clann na Talmhan
Cavan	Michael Sheridan	Fianna Fáil
Cavan	Paddy Smith	Fianna Fáil
Clare	Patrick Burke	Fine Gael
Clare	Thomas Burke	Independent
Clare	Éamon de Valera	Fianna Fáil
Clare	Patrick Hogan	Labour
Clare	Seán O'Grady	Fianna Fáil
Cork Borough	Richard Anthony	Independent
Cork Borough	W. T. Cosgrave	Fine Gael
Cork Borough	Frank Daly	Fianna Fáil
Cork Borough	Séamus Fitzgerald	Fianna Fáil
Cork North	Patrick Halliden	Clann na Talmhan
Cork North	Timothy Linehan	Fine Gael
Cork North	Seán Moylan	Fianna Fáil
Cork North	Leo Skinner	Fianna Fáil
Cork South-East	William Broderick	Fine Gael
Cork South-East	Martin Corry	Fianna Fáil
Cork South-East	Thomas Looney	Labour
Cork West	Seán Buckley	Fianna Fáil
Cork West	Timothy O'Donovan	Fine Gael
Cork West	Timothy J. Murphy	Labour
Cork West	Patrick O'Driscoll	Clann na Talmhan
Cork West	Timothy O'Sullivan	Fianna Fáil
Donegal East	Neal Blaney	Fianna Fáil
Donegal East	John Friel	Fianna Fáil
Donegal East	Daniel McMenamin	Fine Gael
Donegal East	William Sheldon	Clann na Talmhan
Donegal West	Brian Brady	Fianna Fáil
Donegal West	Cormac Breslin	Fianna Fáil
Donegal West	Michael Óg McFadden	Fine Gael
Dublin South	Robert Briscoe	Fianna Fáil
Dublin South	Maurice E. Dockrell	Fine Gael
Dublin South	Peadar Doyle	Fine Gael
Dublin South	James Larkin Jnr	Labour
Dublin South	Seán Lemass	Fianna Fáil
Dublin South	James Lynch	Fianna Fáil
Dublin South	John McCann	Fianna Fáil
Dublin County	Seán Brady	Fianna Fáil
Dublin County	Liam Cosgrave	Fine Gael
Dublin County	Henry Dockrell	Fine Gael
Dublin County	Patrick Fogarty	Fianna Fáil
Dublin County	James Tunney	Labour
Dublin North-East	Alfie Byrne	Independent
Dublin North-East	James Larkin	Labour
Dublin North-East	Oscar Traynor	Fianna Fáil
Dublin North-West	Cormac Breathnach	Fianna Fáil
Dublin North-West	A. P. Byrne	Independent
Dublin North-West	Patrick McGilligan	Fine Gael
Dublin North-West	Seán T. O'Kelly	Fianna Fáil
Dublin North-West	Martin O'Sullivan	Labour
Dublin Townships	Ernest Benson	Fine Gael
Dublin Townships	Bernard Butler	Fianna Fáil
Dublin Townships	Seán MacEntee	Fianna Fáil
Galway East	Patrick Beegan	Fianna Fáil
Galway East	Michael Donnellan	Clann na Talmhan
Galway East	Frank Fahy	Fianna Fáil
Galway East	Mark Killilea Snr	Fianna Fáil
Galway West	Gerald Bartley	Fianna Fáil
Galway West	Eamon Corbett	Fianna Fáil
Galway West	Joseph Mongan	Fine Gael
Kerry North	Patrick Finucane	Clann na Talmhan
Kerry North	Eamon Kissane	Fianna Fáil
Kerry North	Tom McEllistrim	Fianna Fáil
Kerry North	Dan Spring	Labour
Kerry South	Frederick Crowley	Fianna Fáil
Kerry South	John Healy	Fianna Fáil
Kerry South	Fionán Lynch	Fine Gael
Kilkenny	Philip Mahony	Clann na Talmhan
Kilkenny	Thomas Derrig	Fianna Fáil
Kilkenny	James Pattison	Labour
Leitrim	Stephen Flynn	Fianna Fáil
Leitrim	Bernard Maguire	Independent
Leitrim	Mary Reynolds	Fine Gael
Leix–Offaly	Patrick Boland	Fianna Fáil
Leix–Offaly	William Davin	Labour
Leix–Offaly	Oliver J. Flanagan	Monetary Reform
Leix–Offaly	Patrick Gorry	Fianna Fáil
Leix–Offaly	Thomas F. O'Higgins	Fine Gael
Limerick	George C. Bennett	Fine Gael
Limerick	Daniel Bourke	Fianna Fáil
Limerick	Tadhg Crowley	Fianna Fáil
Limerick	Michael Keyes	Labour
Limerick	Donnchadh Ó Briain	Fianna Fáil
Limerick	James Reidy	Fine Gael
Limerick	Robert Ryan	Fianna Fáil
Louth	Frank Aiken	Fianna Fáil
Louth	James Coburn	Fine Gael
Louth	Roddy Connolly	Labour
Mayo North	Patrick Browne	Fine Gael
Mayo North	James Kilroy	Fianna Fáil
Mayo North	P. J. Ruttledge	Fianna Fáil
Mayo South	Joseph Blowick	Clann na Talmhan
Mayo South	Dominick Cafferky	Clann na Talmhan
Mayo South	Micheál Clery	Fianna Fáil
Mayo South	James FitzGerald-Kenney	Fine Gael
Mayo South	Mícheál Ó Móráin	Fianna Fáil
Meath–Westmeath	Charles Fagan	Fine Gael
Meath–Westmeath	Patrick Giles	Fine Gael
Meath–Westmeath	Michael Hilliard	Fianna Fáil
Meath–Westmeath	Michael Kennedy	Fianna Fáil
Meath–Westmeath	Matthew O'Reilly	Fianna Fáil
Monaghan	James Dillon	Independent
Monaghan	Bridget Rice	Fianna Fáil
Monaghan	Conn Ward	Fianna Fáil
Roscommon	John Beirne	Clann na Talmhan
Roscommon	Gerald Boland	Fianna Fáil
Roscommon	John Meighan	Clann na Talmhan
Sligo	Martin Brennan	Fianna Fáil
Sligo	Martin Roddy	Fine Gael
Sligo	Patrick Rogers	Fine Gael
Tipperary	Dan Breen	Fianna Fáil
Tipperary	Andrew Fogarty	Fianna Fáil
Tipperary	Daniel Morrissey	Fine Gael
Tipperary	William O'Donnell	Clann na Talmhan
Tipperary	Jeremiah Ryan	Fine Gael
Tipperary	Martin Ryan	Fianna Fáil
Tipperary	Richard Stapleton	Labour
Waterford	Denis Heskin	Clann na Talmhan
Waterford	Patrick Little	Fianna Fáil
Waterford	Michael Morrissey	Fianna Fáil
Waterford	Bridget Redmond	Fine Gael
Wexford	Denis Allen	Fianna Fáil
Wexford	Richard Corish	Labour
Wexford	John Esmonde	Fine Gael
Wexford	John O'Leary	Labour
Wexford	James Ryan	Fianna Fáil
Wicklow	Christopher Byrne	Fianna Fáil
Wicklow	Patrick Cogan	Clann na Talmhan
Wicklow	James Everett	Labour

== Changes ==
Date	Constituency	Loss	Gain	Note
1 July 1943	Galway East	Fianna Fáil	Ceann Comhairle	Frank Fahy takes office as Ceann Comhairle
22 July 1943	Tipperary	Fianna Fáil		Death of Martin Ryan
July 1943	Donegal East	Clann na Talmhan	Independent	William Sheldon resigns from Clann na Talmhan
7 January 1944	Wicklow	Labour	National Labour Party	James Everett resigns from the Labour Party and joins the National Labour Party as its leader
7 January 1944	Cork South-East	Labour	National Labour Party	Thomas Looney resigns from the Labour Party
7 January 1944	Wexford	Labour	National Labour Party	John O'Leary resigns from the Labour Party
7 January 1944	Kilkenny	Labour	National Labour Party	James Pattison resigns from the Labour Party
7 January 1944	Kerry North	Labour	National Labour Party	Dan Spring resigns from the Labour Party
