= Dublin Townships =

Dáil constituency (1937–1948)

- Former Dáil constituency

Former constituency
- Created: 1937
- Abolished: 1948
- Seats: 3
- Local government area: Dublin City
- Created from: Dublin County
- Replaced by: Dublin South-East

Dublin Townships was a parliamentary constituency represented in Dáil Éireann, the lower house of the Irish parliament or Oireachtas from 1937 to 1948. The constituency elected 3 deputies (Teachtaí Dála, commonly known as TDs) to the Dáil, using proportional representation by means of the single transferable vote (PR-STV).

== History and boundaries ==
Dublin Townships (1937–1948)

The constituency was created under the Electoral (Revision of Constituencies) Act 1935, and first used at the 1937 general election. It was created from the constituency of Dublin County, which was reduced in size. It reflected a transfer of territory from Dublin County to Dublin City effected by the Local Government (Dublin) Act 1930.

The boundaries were defined as: "The area referred to in the Local Government (Dublin) Act 1930, as the added urban districts and also so much of the land described in Part III of the First Schedule to the said Act as is contiguous to the said area and also the townland of Clonskeagh." The "added urban districts" are defined in the 1930 Act as "the urban district of Pembroke and the urban district of Rathmines and Rathgar". Pembroke included Ballsbridge, Donnybrook, Sandymount, Irishtown and Ringsend.

At the next revision of constituencies, under the Electoral (Amendment) Act 1947, it was succeeded by Dublin South-East, which took effect at the 1948 general election.

== TDs ==
Teachtaí Dála (TDs) for Dublin Townships 1937–1948
Key to parties: FF = Fianna Fáil; FG = Fine Gael
Dáil	Election	Deputy (Party)	Deputy (Party)	Deputy (Party)
9th	1937	Seán MacEntee (FF)	John A. Costello (FG)	Ernest Benson (FG)
10th	1938	Seán MacEntee (FF)	John A. Costello (FG)	Ernest Benson (FG)
11th	1943	Seán MacEntee (FF)	Bernard Butler (FF)	Ernest Benson (FG)
12th	1944	Seán MacEntee (FF)	Bernard Butler (FF)	John A. Costello (FG)
13th	1948	Constituency abolished. See Dublin South-East		

Note: The columns in this table are used only for presentational purposes, and no significance should be attached to the order of columns. For details of the order in which seats were won at each election, see the detailed results of that election.

== Elections ==
*: Outgoing TD

=== 1944 general election ===
The surpluses of MacEntee and Costello were distributed on successive counts, but separate figures for the 2nd Count are unavailable.

1944 general election: Dublin Townships
Party	Candidate	FPv%	Count			
Party	Candidate	FPv%	1	2	3	4
Fianna Fáil	Seán MacEntee	27.4	10,034			
Fine Gael	John A. Costello	26.0	9,530			
Fianna Fáil	Bernard Butler	21.6	7,895	N/A	8,748	9,399
Fine Gael	Ernest Benson	19.3	7,056	N/A	7,428	8,523
Labour	Herman Good	5.8	2,104	N/A	2,133	
Electorate: 54,479 Valid: 36,619 Quota: 9,155 Turnout: 67.2%

=== 1943 general election ===
Full figures for the second and third counts are unavailable.

1943 general election: Dublin Townships
Party	Candidate	FPv%	Count			
Party	Candidate	FPv%	1	2	3	4
Fianna Fáil	Seán MacEntee	29.4	11,336			
Fine Gael	Ernest Benson	23.2	8,953	N/A	N/A	9,807
Fine Gael	John A. Costello	19.5	7,508	N/A	N/A	8,794
Fianna Fáil	Bernard Butler	16.8	6,499	N/A	N/A	9,000
Labour	James Cawley	5.7	2,205	N/A	N/A	
Labour	Joseph Browne	5.4	2,096	N/A		
Electorate: 54,479 Valid: 38,597 Quota: 9,650 Turnout: 70.9%

=== 1938 general election ===
1938 general election: Dublin Townships
Party	Candidate	FPv%	Count	
Party	Candidate	FPv%	1	2
Fianna Fáil	Seán MacEntee	30.6	10,903	
Fine Gael	Ernest Benson	27.5	9,804	
Fine Gael	John A. Costello	24.8	8,813	8,905
Fianna Fáil	William Black	17.1	6,081	7,991
Electorate: 53,518 Valid: 35,601 Quota: 8,901 Turnout: 66.5%

=== 1937 general election ===
1937 general election: Dublin Townships
Party	Candidate	FPv%	Count		
Party	Candidate	FPv%	1	2	3
Fianna Fáil	Seán MacEntee	27.4	10,124		
Fine Gael	John A. Costello	22.8	8,418	8,432	8,706
Fine Gael	Ernest Benson	22.5	8,313	8,322	8,471
Independent	Maud Walsh	17.7	6,535	6,590	8,352
Fianna Fáil	Bernard Butler	9.7	3,587	4,388	
Electorate: 52,664 Valid: 36,977 Quota: 9,245 Turnout: 70.2%

== See also ==
- Politics of the Republic of Ireland
- Elections in the Republic of Ireland
