= Martin Corry =

Martin Corry may refer to:

- Martin Corry (politician) (1890–1977), Fianna Fáil politician from Cork 1927–1969
- Martin Corry (rugby union) (born 1973), English rugby union footballer
