= Athlone–Longford =

Dáil constituency (1937–1948)

- Former Dáil constituency

Former constituency
- Created: 1937
- Abolished: 1948
- Seats: 3
- Local government areas: County Longford; County Roscommon; County Westmeath
- Created from: Longford–Westmeath
- Replaced by: Longford–Westmeath

Athlone–Longford was a parliamentary constituency represented in Dáil Éireann, the lower house of the Irish parliament or Oireachtas from 1937 to 1948. The constituency elected 3 deputies (Teachtaí Dála, commonly known as TDs) to the Dáil, on the system of proportional representation by means of the single transferable vote (PR-STV). The constituency covered County Longford and an area to the south centred om the town of Athlone.

== History ==
The constituency was created for the 1937 general election under the Electoral (Revision of Constituencies) Act 1935, replacing the old Longford–Westmeath constituency.

Under the Electoral (Amendment) Act 1947, the constituency was abolished, and the Longford–Westmeath constituency was re-created for the 1948 general election.

== Boundaries ==
The constituency consisted of all of County Longford and parts of counties Roscommon and Westmeath. In the 1935 Act, its boundaries were defined as:

"The administrative County of Longford;

The district electoral divisions of:

Athlone West Rural, Ballydangan, Ballynamona, Caltragh, Carnagh, Carrowreagh, Castlesampson, Cloonburren, Cloonown, Crannagh, Creagh, Culliagh, Drumlosh, Dysart, Kilcar, Kiltoom, Lecarrow, Moore, Rockhill, Taghboy, Taghmaconnell, Thomastown and Turrock in the administrative County of Roscommon; and

The district electoral divisions of:

Ardnagragh, Athlone East Rural, Auburn, Carn, Castledaly, Doonis, Glassan, Killinure, Mount Temple, Moydrum, Muckanagh, Noughaval and Tubbrit and the Urban District of Athlone in the administrative County of Westmeath."

== TDs ==
Teachtaí Dála (TDs) for Athlone–Longford 1937–1948
Dáil	Election	Deputy (Party)	Deputy (Party)	Deputy (Party)
9th	1937	Matthew Davis (FF)	James Victory (FF)	Seán Mac Eoin (FG)
10th	1938	Erskine H. Childers (FF)	James Victory (FF)	Seán Mac Eoin (FG)
11th	1943	Erskine H. Childers (FF)	Thomas Carter (FF)	Seán Mac Eoin (FG)
12th	1944	Erskine H. Childers (FF)	Thomas Carter (FF)	Seán Mac Eoin (FG)
13th	1948	Constituency abolished. See Longford–Westmeath		

Note: The columns in this table are used only for presentational purposes, and no significance should be attached to the order of columns. For details of the order in which seats were won at each election, see the detailed results of that election.

== Elections ==
*: Outgoing TD

=== 1944 general election ===
1944 general election: Athlone–Longford
Party	Candidate	FPv%	Count			
Party	Candidate	FPv%	1	2	3	4
Fianna Fáil	Thomas Carter	24.6	6,501	6,564	6,638	
Fine Gael	Seán Mac Eoin	23.6	6,235	8,090		
Fianna Fáil	Erskine H. Childers	17.8	4,716	4,857	5,003	7,484
Labour	Martin Timlin	12.3	3,266	3,701	4,537	4,923
Fianna Fáil	James Victory	11.7	3,110	3,198	3,273	
Fine Gael	Michael O'Meara	10.0	2,646			
Electorate: 38,932 Valid: 26,474 Quota: 6,619 Turnout: 68.0%

=== 1943 general election ===
1943 general election: Athlone–Longford
Party	Candidate	FPv%	Count						
Party	Candidate	FPv%	1	2	3	4	5	6	7
Fine Gael	Seán Mac Eoin	24.4	6,979	7,183					
Fianna Fáil	Erskine H. Childers	14.6	4,180	4,251	4,253	4,564	4,851	7,063	7,831
Fianna Fáil	Thomas Carter	14.1	4,041	4,407	4,417	4,640	4,794	6,245	7,122
Fianna Fáil	James Victory	14.0	4,010	4,121	4,121	4,237	4,421		
Labour	Martin Timlin	10.9	3,119	3,380	3,386	4,512	5,347	5,671	
Fine Gael	William Finnerty	10.5	3,012	3,055	3,065	3,281			
Labour	Henry Broderick	7.2	2,055	2,100	2,101				
Independent	Thomas Murray	4.2	1,216						
Electorate: 38,932 Valid: 28,612 Quota: 7,154 Turnout: 73.5%

=== 1938 general election ===
1938 general election: Athlone–Longford
Party	Candidate	FPv%	Count			
Party	Candidate	FPv%	1	2	3	4
Fine Gael	Seán Mac Eoin	23.8	6,936	7,963		
Fianna Fáil	James Victory	21.0	6,107	6,527	6,620	8,891
Fianna Fáil	Erskine H. Childers	16.8	4,885	5,321	5,420	7,308
Fianna Fáil	Matthew Davis	15.2	4,418	4,700	4,741	
Fine Gael	William Finnerty	14.4	4,183	4,382	4,837	5,144
Labour	Martin Timlin	8.8	2,570			
Electorate: 38,108 Valid: 29,099 Quota: 7,275 Turnout: 76.4%

=== 1937 general election ===
1937 general election: Athlone–Longford
Party	Candidate	FPv%	Count							
Party	Candidate	FPv%	1	2	3	4	5	6	7	8
Fine Gael	Seán Mac Eoin	25.8	7,587							
Fianna Fáil	James Victory	15.5	4,565	4,573	4,682	4,908	5,176	6,224	7,116	7,966
Fianna Fáil	Matthew Davis	14.0	4,132	4,135	4,197	4,302	4,562	5,077	5,356	6,428
Fine Gael	William Finnerty	12.1	3,556	3,717	3,795	3,840	4,006	4,093	4,289	4,973
Labour	Henry Broderick	10.2	3,018	3,025	3,064	3,361	3,476	3,594	3,828	
Independent	Seán Lynch	6.6	1,929	1,945	2,074	2,206	2,424	2,491		
Fianna Fáil	Patrick Killion	6.1	1,808	1,810	1,853	1,909	1,966			
Independent	Joseph Burke	3.9	1,159	1,167	1,239	1,382				
Independent	Hubert Wilson	3.5	1,031	1,039	1,106					
Independent	Seán Duffy	2.2	662	674						
Electorate: 38,295 Valid: 29,447 Quota: 7,362 Turnout: 76.9%

== See also ==
- Dáil constituencies
- Politics of the Republic of Ireland
- Historic Dáil constituencies
- Elections in the Republic of Ireland
