= Cork South-East =

Cork South-East or South East Cork may refer to one of two parliamentary constituencies in County Cork, Ireland:

- Cork South-East (Dáil constituency) (1937–1948)
- South East Cork (UK Parliament constituency) (1885–1922)
