= Cork South East =

Cork South East may refer to:

- South East Cork (UK Parliament constituency), UK Parliament constituency in Ireland from 1885 to 1922
- Cork South-East (Dáil constituency), Dáil Éireann constituency in Ireland from 1937 to 1948
