= Galway West by-election =

Galway West by-election may refer to:

- 1940 Galway West by-election, following the death of Seán Tubridy
- 1975 Galway West by-election, following the death of Johnny Geoghegan, won by Máire Geoghegan-Quinn
- 2026 Galway West by-election, following the election of Catherine Connolly as president
