= Jeremiah Hurley =

Irish Labour Party politician and teacher (1891–1943)

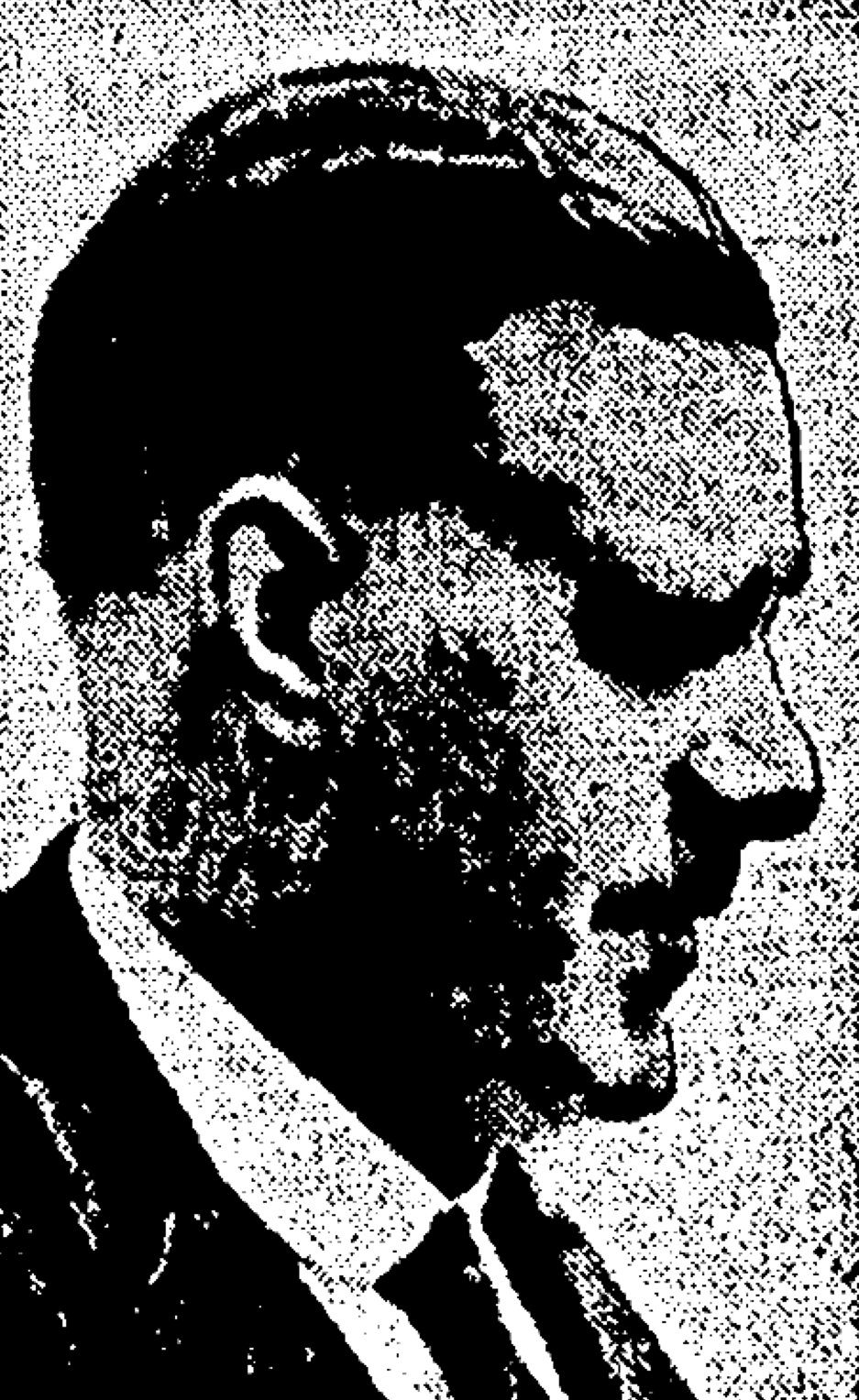

Teachta Dála
- In office July 1937 – 2 February 1943
- Constituency: Cork South-East

Personal details
- Born: 1891 Macroom, County Cork, Ireland
- Died: 2 February 1943 (aged 51–52) Cork, Ireland
- Party: Labour Party

Jeremiah Hurley (1891 – 2 February 1943) was an Irish Labour Party politician, trade unionist and national schoolteacher.

Hurley was a member of Cork Corporation from 1931 to 1938, having been nominated by Cork Workers' Council. He was an unsuccessful candidate for the Cork Borough constituency at the 1932 and 1933 general elections.

He was elected to Dáil Éireann as a Labour Party Teachta Dála (TD) for the Cork South-East constituency at the 1937 general election. He was re-elected at the 1938 general election.

He was president of the Irish Trades Union Congress in 1938. He died in 1943 during the term of the 10th Dáil but no by-election was held.

Political offices
Preceded by Helena Molony	President of the Irish Trades Union Congress; 1938	Succeeded by P. T. Daly

Dáil	Election	Deputy (Party)	Deputy (Party)	Deputy (Party)
9th	1937	Jeremiah Hurley (Lab)	Martin Corry (FF)	Brook Brasier (FG)
10th	1938	Jeremiah Hurley (Lab)	Martin Corry (FF)	Brook Brasier (FG)
11th	1943	Thomas Looney (Lab)	Martin Corry (FF)	William Broderick (FG)
12th	1944	Seán McCarthy (FF)	Martin Corry (FF)	William Broderick (FG)
13th	1948	Constituency abolished		
