= Muintir na Gaeltachta =

Muintir na Gaeltachta (Irish for 'people of the Gaeltacht') was a lobby-group representing Irish-speaking inhabitants of the Gaeltacht. It was founded in the winter of 1933–1934, with Seán Ó Coisdeala, a national school teacher from Tully in Connemara, as President and Pádraig Seoige as secretary. Other founders included Peadar Duignan, Seán Tubridy, and Máirtín Ó Cadhain. In 1935, in conjunction with the Land Commission, it helped to establish the Meath Gaeltacht by transplanting Irish-speaking families from Connacht. Its office was in Kells, County Meath. It was a registered nominating body for the Cultural and Educational Panel of Seanad Éireann through the 1997 election.
