= Brook Brasier =

Irish politician (1879–1940)

Teachta Dála
- In office July 1937 – 30 August 1940
- Constituency: Cork South-East
- In office February 1932 – January 1933
- Constituency: Cork East

Personal details
- Born: 1 February 1879 County Donegal, Ireland
- Died: 30 August 1940 (aged 61) County Donegal, Ireland
- Party: Fine Gael, Farmers' Party
- Spouse: Lady Charlotte Moore (m. 1898; died 1913)

Brook Wellington Brasier (1 February 1879 – 30 August 1940) was an Irish politician.

He was born 1 February 1879 in Sunday's Well, Cork, the second son of Brooke Brasier and his wife Clarine Bennett (née Massey). The family later resided at Carrigaline, County Cork. In August 1898 he married Lady Charlotte Moore, youngest daughter of Charles William Moore, 5th Earl Mount Cashell. Lady Charlotte was his elder by twenty-six years; they had no children. It was not till after his wife's death in August 1913, that he became involved in public life.

Brasier stood unsuccessfully for election as a Farmers' Party candidate for the Cork East constituency at the June 1927 and September 1927 general elections. He was first elected to Dáil Éireann as an Independent Teachta Dála (TD) for the Cork East constituency at the 1932 general election. He lost his seat at the 1933 general election. He was elected as a Fine Gael TD for the Cork South-East constituency at the 1937 general election and retained his seat at the 1938 general election. He died in 1940 during the 10th Dáil but no by-election was held to fill his seat.

| Dáil | Election | Deputy (Party) | Deputy (Party) | Deputy (Party) | Deputy (Party) | Deputy (Party) |
|---|---|---|---|---|---|---|
| 4th | 1923 | John Daly (Ind.) | Michael Hennessy (CnaG) | David Kent (Rep) | John Dinneen (FP) | Thomas O'Mahony (CnaG) |
| 4th | 1924 by-election | John Daly (Ind.) | Michael Hennessy (CnaG) | David Kent (Rep) | John Dinneen (FP) | Michael K. Noonan (CnaG) |
| 5th | 1927 (Jun) | John Daly (Ind.) | Michael Hennessy (CnaG) | David Kent (SF) | David O'Gorman (FP) | Martin Corry (FF) |
| 6th | 1927 (Sep) | John Daly (CnaG) | Michael Hennessy (CnaG) | William Kent (FF) | Edmond Carey (CnaG) | Martin Corry (FF) |
| 7th | 1932 | John Daly (CnaG) | William Broderick (CnaG) | Brook Brasier (Ind.) | Patrick Murphy (FF) | Martin Corry (FF) |
| 8th | 1933 | Patrick Daly (CnaG) | William Broderick (CnaG) | William Kent (NCP) | Patrick Murphy (FF) | Martin Corry (FF) |
| 9th | 1937 | Constituency abolished | | | | |

| Dáil | Election | Deputy (Party) | Deputy (Party) | Deputy (Party) |
|---|---|---|---|---|
| 13th | 1948 | Martin Corry (FF) | Patrick O'Gorman (FG) | Seán Keane (Lab) |
| 14th | 1951 | Martin Corry (FF) | Patrick O'Gorman (FG) | Seán Keane (Lab) |
| 14th | 1953 by-election | Martin Corry (FF) | Patrick O'Gorman (FG) | Richard Barry (FG) |
| 15th | 1954 | Martin Corry (FF) | John Moher (FF) | Richard Barry (FG) |
| 16th | 1957 | Martin Corry (FF) | John Moher (FF) | Richard Barry (FG) |
| 17th | 1961 | Constituency abolished | | |

| Dáil | Election | Deputy (Party) | Deputy (Party) | Deputy (Party) | Deputy (Party) |
|---|---|---|---|---|---|
| 22nd | 1981 | Carey Joyce (FF) | Myra Barry (FG) | Patrick Hegarty (FG) | Joe Sherlock (SF–WP) |
| 23rd | 1982 (Feb) | Michael Ahern (FF) | Myra Barry (FG) | Patrick Hegarty (FG) | Joe Sherlock (SF–WP) |
| 24th | 1982 (Nov) | Michael Ahern (FF) | Myra Barry (FG) | Patrick Hegarty (FG) | Ned O'Keeffe (FF) |
| 25th | 1987 | Michael Ahern (FF) | Joe Sherlock (WP) | Patrick Hegarty (FG) | Ned O'Keeffe (FF) |
| 26th | 1989 | Michael Ahern (FF) | Joe Sherlock (WP) | Paul Bradford (FG) | Ned O'Keeffe (FF) |
| 27th | 1992 | Michael Ahern (FF) | John Mulvihill (Lab) | Paul Bradford (FG) | Ned O'Keeffe (FF) |
| 28th | 1997 | Michael Ahern (FF) | David Stanton (FG) | Paul Bradford (FG) | Ned O'Keeffe (FF) |
| 29th | 2002 | Michael Ahern (FF) | David Stanton (FG) | Joe Sherlock (Lab) | Ned O'Keeffe (FF) |
| 30th | 2007 | Michael Ahern (FF) | David Stanton (FG) | Seán Sherlock (Lab) | Ned O'Keeffe (FF) |
| 31st | 2011 | Sandra McLellan (SF) | David Stanton (FG) | Seán Sherlock (Lab) | Tom Barry (FG) |
| 32nd | 2016 | Pat Buckley (SF) | David Stanton (FG) | Seán Sherlock (Lab) | Kevin O'Keeffe (FF) |
| 33rd | 2020 | Pat Buckley (SF) | David Stanton (FG) | Seán Sherlock (Lab) | James O'Connor (FF) |
| 34th | 2024 | Pat Buckley (SF) | Noel McCarthy (FG) | Liam Quaide (SD) | James O'Connor (FF) |

| Dáil | Election | Deputy (Party) | Deputy (Party) | Deputy (Party) |
|---|---|---|---|---|
| 9th | 1937 | Jeremiah Hurley (Lab) | Martin Corry (FF) | Brook Brasier (FG) |
| 10th | 1938 | Jeremiah Hurley (Lab) | Martin Corry (FF) | Brook Brasier (FG) |
| 11th | 1943 | Thomas Looney (Lab) | Martin Corry (FF) | William Broderick (FG) |
| 12th | 1944 | Seán McCarthy (FF) | Martin Corry (FF) | William Broderick (FG) |
| 13th | 1948 | Constituency abolished | | |
