= 1940 Galway West by-election =

By-election to the 10th Dáil

- 30 May 1940
- Turnout: 20,571 (47.7%)
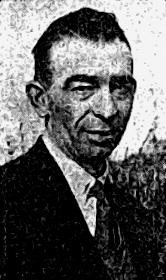
	Keane
Nominee	John J. Keane	Michael Donnellan
Party	Fianna Fáil	Clann na Talmhan
First preferences	14,836	5,735
Percentage	72.1%	27.9%
TD before election
Seán Tubridy
Fianna Fáil
TD after election
John J. Keane
Fianna Fáil

A Dáil by-election was held in the constituency of Galway West in Ireland on Thursday, 30 May 1940, to fill a vacancy in the 10th Dáil. It followed the death of Fianna Fáil TD Seán Tubridy on 15 July 1939.

In 1940, Galway West was a three seat constituency comprising Galway City and the western parts of County Galway. The writ of election to fill the vacancy was agreed by the Dáil on 9 May 1940.

The by-election was won by the Fianna Fáil candidate John J. Keane.

Keane lost his seat at the 1943 general election, and was never subsequently re-elected to the Dáil. The runner-up Michael Donnellan of Clann na Talmhan was elected for Galway East at the 1943 general election.

== Result ==
1940 Galway West by-election
Party	Candidate	FPv%	Count
Party	Candidate	FPv%	1
Fianna Fáil	John J. Keane	72.1	14,836
Clann na Talmhan	Michael Donnellan	27.9	5,735
Electorate: 43,091 Valid: 20,571 Quota: 10,286 Turnout: 47.7%
