= Seán Tubridy =

Irish politician (1897–1939)

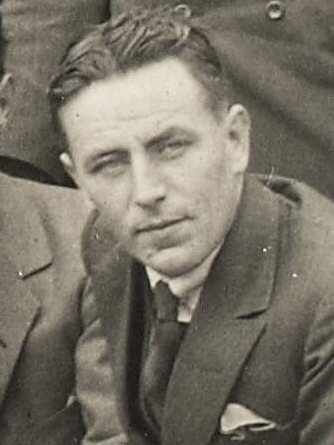
- Tubridy in 1927

Teachta Dála
- In office July 1937 – 15 July 1939
- Constituency: Galway West
- In office June 1927 – February 1932
- Constituency: Galway

Personal details
- Born: John Andrew Tubridy; 8 August 1896 Claremorris, County Mayo, Ireland
- Died: 15 July 1939 (aged 42) Galway, Ireland
- Party: Fianna Fáil
- Other political affiliations: Muintir na Gaeltachta
- Spouse: Kathleen Moira Ryan
- Children: 3
- Relatives: Ryan Tubridy (grandson)
- Profession: Medical practitioner, Politician

Seán Tubridy (8 August 1896 – 15 July 1939) was an Irish politician and medical practitioner. Tubridy had two terms as a Fianna Fáil TD for Galway, from 1927 to 1932 and 1937 to 1939. His parents had originally moved to Carraroe in Connemara to teach at the local Irish-language school. Tubridy was also involved in Gaeltacht affairs and in the mid-1930s was a co-founder of Muintir na Gaeltachta, along with Peadar Duignan and Máirtín Ó Cadhain.

== Early life ==
John Andrew Tubridy was born in 1896 at Ballygowan, Claremorris, County Mayo, to Patrick Tubridy and Jane nee Waldron. He had only one sibling, a sister, Mary Tubridy. Seán's father was from Kilmurry Ibrickane, County Clare, and his mother from Kilkelly, County Mayo; they were both Gaeilgeoirí and had moved to the Irish-speaking area of Connemara to teach at the Scoil Mhic Dara in Carraroe. They worked with Roger Casement and helped to set up a fund for free school dinners there.

Tubridy was a medical practitioner who fought against the epidemics of cholera, typhus and the Spanish Flu in Connemara. He married a Dubliner, Kathleen Moira Ryan, daughter of Hugh Ryan, the Professor of Chemistry at University College Dublin. The youngest of their three children was a son Patrick Tubridy, who married Catherine Andrews, the daughter of Todd Andrews, a prominent former member of the Irish Republican Army. Patrick himself had several children, including the broadcaster Ryan Tubridy.

== Dáil Éireann ==
Tubridy was first elected to Dáil Éireann as a Fianna Fáil Teachta Dála (TD) for the Galway constituency at the June 1927 general election. He was re-elected at the September 1927 general election but lost his seat at the 1932 general election. He stood unsuccessfully at the 1933 general election but was elected for the Galway West constituency at the 1937 general election. He was re-elected at the 1938 general election, but died during the 10th Dáil in July 1939. The by-election caused by his death was held on 30 May 1940 and was won by John J. Keane of Fianna Fáil.

== See also ==
- Michael G. Tubridy

Dáil	Election	Deputy (Party)	Deputy (Party)	Deputy (Party)	Deputy (Party)	Deputy (Party)	Deputy (Party)	Deputy (Party)	Deputy (Party)	Deputy (Party)
2nd	1921	Liam Mellows (SF)	Bryan Cusack (SF)	Frank Fahy (SF)	Joseph Whelehan (SF)	Pádraic Ó Máille (SF)	George Nicolls (SF)	Patrick Hogan (SF)	7 seats 1921–1923	
3rd	1922	Thomas O'Connell (Lab)	Bryan Cusack (AT-SF)	Frank Fahy (AT-SF)	Joseph Whelehan (PT-SF)	Pádraic Ó Máille (PT-SF)	George Nicolls (PT-SF)	Patrick Hogan (PT-SF)	7 seats 1921–1923	
4th	1923	Thomas O'Connell (Lab)	Barney Mellows (Rep)	Frank Fahy (Rep)	Louis O'Dea (Rep)	Pádraic Ó Máille (CnaG)	George Nicolls (CnaG)	Patrick Hogan (CnaG)	Seán Broderick (CnaG)	James Cosgrave (Ind.)
5th	1927 (Jun)	Gilbert Lynch (Lab)	Thomas Powell (FF)	Frank Fahy (Note: Frank Fahy served as Ceann Comhairle from 9 March 1932.) (FF)	Seán Tubridy (FF)	Mark Killilea Snr (FF)	Martin McDonogh (CnaG)	Patrick Hogan (CnaG)	Seán Broderick (CnaG)	William Duffy (NL)
6th	1927 (Sep)	Stephen Jordan (FF)	Thomas Powell (FF)	Frank Fahy (FF)	Seán Tubridy (FF)	Mark Killilea Snr (FF)	Martin McDonogh (CnaG)	Patrick Hogan (CnaG)	Seán Broderick (CnaG)	Joseph Mongan (CnaG)
7th	1932	Stephen Jordan (FF)	Thomas Powell (FF)	Frank Fahy (FF)	Patrick Beegan (FF)	Gerald Bartley (FF)	Fred McDonogh (CnaG)	Patrick Hogan (CnaG)	Seán Broderick (CnaG)	Joseph Mongan (CnaG)
8th	1933	Stephen Jordan (FF)	Mark Killilea Snr (FF)	Frank Fahy (FF)	Patrick Beegan (FF)	Gerald Bartley (FF)	Séamus Keely (FF)	Patrick Hogan (CnaG)	Seán Broderick (CnaG)	Martin McDonogh (CnaG)
8th	1935 by-election	Stephen Jordan (FF)	Mark Killilea Snr (FF)	Frank Fahy (FF)	Patrick Beegan (FF)	Gerald Bartley (FF)	Séamus Keely (FF)	Patrick Hogan (CnaG)	Seán Broderick (CnaG)	Eamon Corbett (FF)
8th	1936 by-election	Stephen Jordan (FF)	Mark Killilea Snr (FF)	Frank Fahy (FF)	Patrick Beegan (FF)	Gerald Bartley (FF)	Séamus Keely (FF)	Martin Neilan (FF)	Seán Broderick (CnaG)	Eamon Corbett (FF)
9th	1937	Constituency abolished. See Galway East and Galway West								
