= Thomas Looney =

Irish politician

Teachta Dála
- In office June 1943 – May 1944
- Constituency: Cork South-East

Personal details
- Born: County Cork, Ireland
- Party: Labour Party
- Other political affiliations: National Labour Party

Thomas David Looney was an Irish Labour Party politician. He was first elected to Dáil Éireann as a Labour Party Teachta Dála (TD) for the Cork South-East constituency at the 1943 general election.

In 1944 the Labour Party split and Looney became a member of the new political movement, the National Labour Party. The split was healed when new party merged with the Labour Party in 1950. He stood as an independent candidate at the 1944 general election but lost his seat.

Dáil	Election	Deputy (Party)	Deputy (Party)	Deputy (Party)
9th	1937	Jeremiah Hurley (Lab)	Martin Corry (FF)	Brook Brasier (FG)
10th	1938	Jeremiah Hurley (Lab)	Martin Corry (FF)	Brook Brasier (FG)
11th	1943	Thomas Looney (Lab)	Martin Corry (FF)	William Broderick (FG)
12th	1944	Seán McCarthy (FF)	Martin Corry (FF)	William Broderick (FG)
13th	1948	Constituency abolished		
