= Matthew Davis (politician) =

Irish politician (died 1957)

Teachta Dála
- In office July 1937 – June 1938
- Constituency: Athlone–Longford

Personal details
- Born: c. 1892 County Roscommon, Ireland
- Died: 29 August 1957 (aged 64–65)
- Party: Fianna Fáil; Clann na Talmhan

Matthew Davis (died 29 August 1957) was an Irish Fianna Fáil politician.

He was a native of Kilteevan, County Roscommon. In 1934, aged 42, he won a county junior championship medal in Gaelic football for Kilteevan.

He joined the Irish Volunteers in 1917 and later became a member of the Kilteevan Company of the Irish Republican Army. He later served as quartermaster of the South Roscommon Brigade. During the Irish Civil War, he took the anti-Treaty side and he was officer commanding of the 3rd Western Brigade, 2n Western Division.

He was captured on Quaker Island on the River Shannon, interned in Athlone, sentenced to death but later reprieved.

Transferred to Mountjoy Prison, he spent 22 days on hunger strike and was released in 1924.

A member of Fianna Fáil from its foundation, he was elected for that party to Roscommon County Council in 1928. He was elected to Dáil Éireann as a Fianna Fáil TD for the Athlone–Longford constituency at the 1937 general election. He lost his seat at the 1938 general election.

In 1945, he left Fianna Fáil to join Clann na Talmhan and unsuccessfully contested the 1948 election for that party in the 1948 general election for the Roscommon constituency.

Dáil	Election	Deputy (Party)	Deputy (Party)	Deputy (Party)
9th	1937	Matthew Davis (FF)	James Victory (FF)	Seán Mac Eoin (FG)
10th	1938	Erskine H. Childers (FF)	James Victory (FF)	Seán Mac Eoin (FG)
11th	1943	Erskine H. Childers (FF)	Thomas Carter (FF)	Seán Mac Eoin (FG)
12th	1944	Erskine H. Childers (FF)	Thomas Carter (FF)	Seán Mac Eoin (FG)
13th	1948	Constituency abolished. See Longford–Westmeath		
