= Ernest Benson =

Irish politician and businessman (1898–1975)

Teachta Dála
- In office July 1937 – May 1944
- Constituency: Dublin Townships

Personal details
- Born: 5 October 1898 Dublin, Ireland
- Died: 15 March 1975 (aged 76) Greystones, County Wicklow, Ireland
- Party: Fine Gael
- Spouses: Emily Healy (m. 1922; died 1926); Almeria Fitzpatrick (m. 1928)
- Children: 6
- Education: Trinity College Dublin

Military service
- Branch/service: British Army
- Rank: Second lieutenant
- Unit: Lancashire Fusiliers
- Battles/wars: World War I

Ernest Edmondson Benson (5 October 1898 – 15 March 1975) was an Irish Fine Gael politician and businessman.

He was born 5 October 1898 in Dublin, the second child of Robert Benson, a company director, and Bessie Benson (née Hulme); the family were Quakers. The family lived at 3 Orwell Road, Rathgar, Dublin. He was educated at Ackworth and Bootham Schools, Yorkshire, from 1912 to 1915.

Edmondson served as a Second lieutenant in the Lancashire Fusiliers during World War I from 1916 to 1918. He returned to Ireland after being wounded in action. He entered Trinity College Dublin, graduating BA in 1919. In 1920, he entered the family business, the Dublin Laundry Co. Ltd; he became managing director of the firm in 1947, and later of Dartry Ltd.

He was a member of Dublin Corporation from 1933 to 1945. He was prominent in Dublin business circles, he was chairman of Dublin Chamber of Commerce in 1944, an elected member of the council of the Federated Union of Employers (vice-chairman 1947–1956), a member of the labour court (1956–1969) and a founding member of the council of the British Launderers Research Association (1940–1959). Outside business and politics he was a commissioner (1933–1975), vice-chairman (1961), and chairman (1963–1965) of Irish Lights.

A keen swimmer in his youth, he was Irish national swimming champion in the half-mile, quarter-mile, and 220 yards during the 1920s. Later he was a member of the Leinster Committee of the Royal Life Saving Association.

He was elected to Dáil Éireann as a Fine Gael Teachta Dála (TD) for the Dublin Townships constituency at the 1937 general election. He was re-elected at the 1938 and 1943 general elections. He lost his seat at the 1944 general election.

He married Emily Healy in September 1922; they had one child. Emily died in 1926. In April 1928 he married Almeria Fitzpatrick (d. 1985), and they lived on Milltown Road, Dublin, and later in Greystones, County Wicklow. They had five children. He died 15 March 1975 at home, leaving an estate valued at £4,532.

Dáil	Election	Deputy (Party)	Deputy (Party)	Deputy (Party)
9th	1937	Seán MacEntee (FF)	John A. Costello (FG)	Ernest Benson (FG)
10th	1938	Seán MacEntee (FF)	John A. Costello (FG)	Ernest Benson (FG)
11th	1943	Seán MacEntee (FF)	Bernard Butler (FF)	Ernest Benson (FG)
12th	1944	Seán MacEntee (FF)	Bernard Butler (FF)	John A. Costello (FG)
13th	1948	Constituency abolished. See Dublin South-East		
