= Cork South-East (Dáil constituency) =

Dáil constituency (1937–1948)

- Former Dáil constituency

Former constituency
- Created: 1937
- Abolished: 1948
- Seats: 3
- Local government area: County Cork

Cork South-East was a parliamentary constituency represented in Dáil Éireann, the lower house of the Irish parliament or Oireachtas from 1937 to 1948. The constituency elected 3 deputies (Teachtaí Dála, commonly known as TDs) to the Dáil, on the system of proportional representation by means of the single transferable vote (PR-STV).

== History ==
The constituency was created under the Electoral (Revision of Constituencies) Act 1935, for the 1937 general election to the Dáil Éireann. It succeeded the old Cork East constituency. It was abolished under the Electoral (Amendment) Act 1947, when it was replaced by the new constituency of Cork South.

== Boundaries ==
It consisted of the district electoral divisions of:

"Ballincollig, Ballintemple, Ballycotton, Ballyfeard, Ballyfoyle, Ballygarvan, Ballymartle, Ballynaglogh, Ballyspillane, Bishopstown, Blackpool, Blarney, Caherlag, Carrigaline (Cork), Carrigaline (Kinsale), Carrignavar, Carrigrohane Beg, Carrigtwohill, Castlemartyr, Clonmult, Cloyne, Cobh Rural, Corkbeg, Cullen, Dangan, Douglas, Dripsey, Dunderrow, Dungourney, Farrenbrien, Firmount, Garryvoe, Glenville, Greenfort, Ightermurragh, Inch, Inishkenny, Killeagh (Cork), Kilmonoge, Kilpatrick, Kinure, Knockantota, Knockraha, Lehenagh, Liscleary, Lisgoold, Matehy, Middleton Rural, Mogeely, Monkstown Rural, Nohaval, Ovens, Rathcooney, Riverstown, Rostellan, St. Mary's, Templebodan, Templebreedy, Templemichael, Templenacarriga and Whitechurch and the Urban Districts of Cobh, Midleton and Passage West in the administrative county of Cork".

== TDs ==
Teachtaí Dála (TDs) for Cork South-East 1937–1948
Key to parties: FG = Fine Gael; FF = Fianna Fáil; Lab = Labour
Dáil	Election	Deputy (Party)	Deputy (Party)	Deputy (Party)
9th	1937	Jeremiah Hurley (Lab)	Martin Corry (FF)	Brook Brasier (FG)
10th	1938	Jeremiah Hurley (Lab)	Martin Corry (FF)	Brook Brasier (FG)
11th	1943	Thomas Looney (Lab)	Martin Corry (FF)	William Broderick (FG)
12th	1944	Seán McCarthy (FF)	Martin Corry (FF)	William Broderick (FG)
13th	1948	Constituency abolished		

Note: The columns in this table are used only for presentational purposes, and no significance should be attached to the order of columns. For details of the order in which seats were won at each election, see the detailed results of that election.

== Elections ==
*: Outgoing TD

=== 1944 general election ===
1944 general election: Cork South-East
Party	Candidate	FPv%	Count				
Party	Candidate	FPv%	1	2	3	4	5
Fianna Fáil	Martin Corry	26.5	8,038				
Clann na Talmhan	Patrick Lehane	18.1	5,484	5,516	5,635	5,913	6,399
Fine Gael	William Broderick	17.6	5,350	5,365	5,691	6,074	6,684
Fianna Fáil	Seán McCarthy	17.0	5,155	5,494	5,656	5,915	7,111
National Labour Party	Thomas Looney	10.2	3,087	3,120	3,336	3,888	
Labour	Dan Desmond	5.4	1,636	1,653	2,275		
Labour	David Barry	5.3	1,603	1,616			
Electorate: 44,356 Valid: 30,353 Quota: 7,589 Turnout: 68.4%

=== 1943 general election ===
1943 general election: Cork South-East
Party	Candidate	FPv%	Count					
Party	Candidate	FPv%	1	2	3	4	5	6
Fianna Fáil	Martin Corry	26.7	8,767					
Fine Gael	William Broderick	18.6	6,123	6,135	6,222	6,657	8,364	
Clann na Talmhan	Patrick Lehane	13.7	4,499	4,523	4,571	4,870	5,215	5,909
Fianna Fáil	Seán McCarthy	10.3	3,374	3,794	3,915	4,413	4,640	
Labour	Thomas Looney	8.4	2,755	2,776	4,568	5,374	5,585	6,355
Fine Gael	Edmond Carey	8.0	2,644	2,654	2,697	2,882		
Independent	John Hurley	7.5	2,481	2,525	2,650			
Labour	Patrick O'Brien	6.8	2,248	2,261				
Electorate: 44,356 Valid: 32,891 Quota: 8,223 Turnout: 74.2%

=== 1938 general election ===
1938 general election: Cork South-East
Party	Candidate	FPv%	Count		
Party	Candidate	FPv%	1	2	3
Fine Gael	Brook Brasier	26.8	8,535		
Fianna Fáil	Martin Corry	24.2	7,701	7,715	8,116
Labour	Jeremiah Hurley	18.4	5,872	5,908	7,587
Fianna Fáil	Eoin O'Mahony	16.2	5,175	5,187	5,710
Fine Gael	Edmond Carey	14.4	4,597	5,099	
Electorate: 41,655 Valid: 31,880 Quota: 7,971 Turnout: 76.5%

=== 1937 general election ===
1937 general election: Cork South-East
Party	Candidate	FPv%	Count		
Party	Candidate	FPv%	1	2	3
Fine Gael	Brook Brasier	27.7	8,594		
Fianna Fáil	Martin Corry	24.4	7,567	10,134	
Labour	Jeremiah Hurley	21.7	6,720	7,261	8,958
Fine Gael	William Broderick	15.5	4,818	4,926	5,010
Fianna Fáil	Michael Leahy	10.7	3,315		
Electorate: 41,669 Valid: 31,014 Quota: 7,754 Turnout: 74.4%

== See also ==
- Dáil constituencies
- Politics of the Republic of Ireland
- Historic Dáil constituencies
- Elections in the Republic of Ireland
