= Government of the 11th Dáil =

Government of Ireland 1943 to 1944

3rd government of Ireland
- Government of Ireland

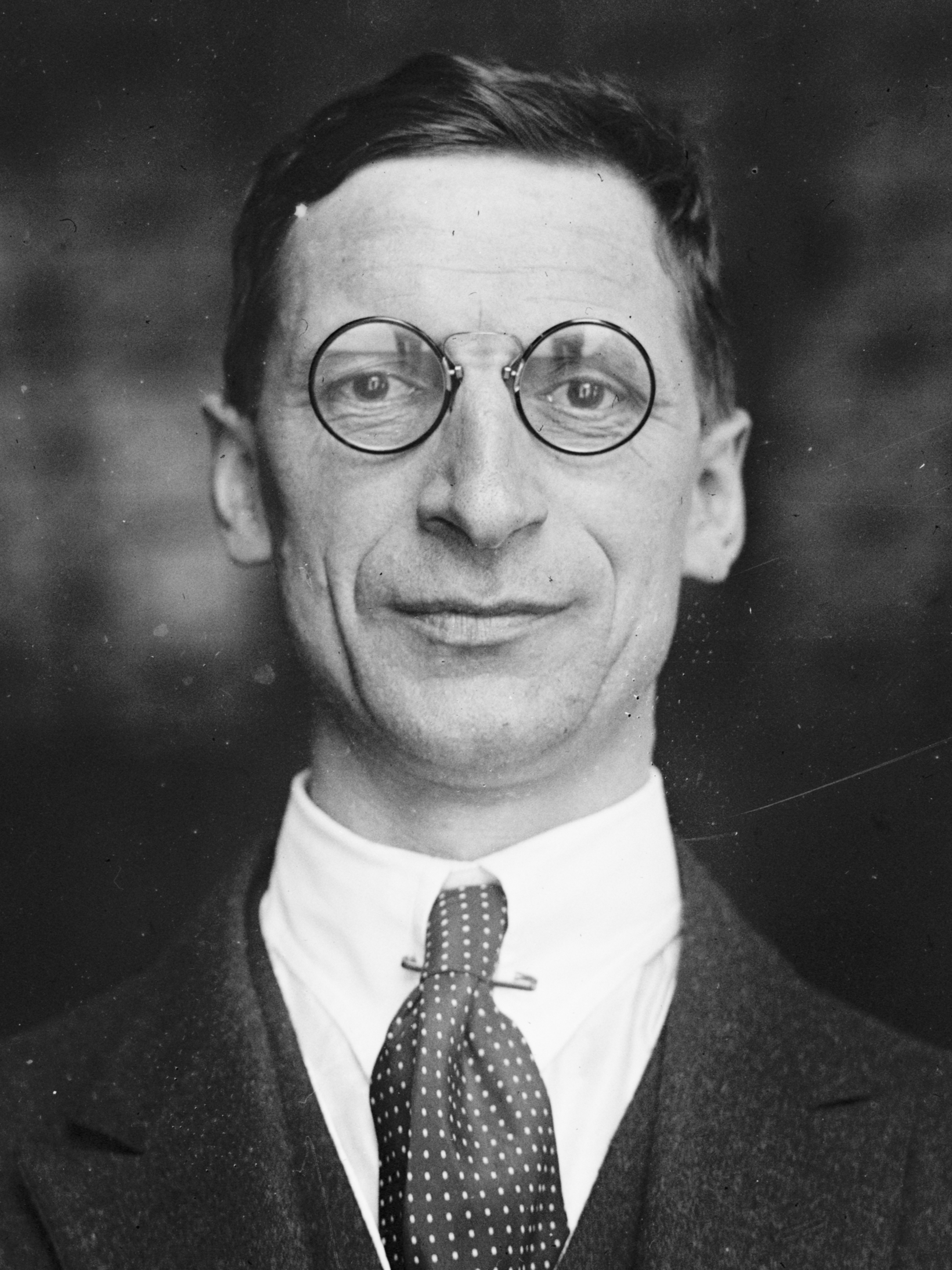
- Date formed: 1 July 1943
- Date dissolved: 9 June 1944

People and organisations
- President: Douglas Hyde
- Taoiseach: Éamon de Valera
- Tánaiste: Seán T. O'Kelly
- Total no. of members: 12
- Member party: Fianna Fáil
- Status in legislature: Minority government
- Opposition party: Fine Gael
- Opposition leader: W. T. Cosgrave (1943–Jan. 1944); Thomas F. O'Higgins (Jan.–June 1944)

History
- Election: 1943 general election
- Legislature terms: 11th Dáil; 4th Seanad
- Predecessor: 2nd government
- Successor: 4th government

The 3rd government of Ireland (1 July 1943 – 9 June 1944) was the government of Ireland formed after the 1943 general election to the 11th Dáil held on 23 June. It was a single-party Fianna Fáil government led by Éamon de Valera as Taoiseach. Fianna Fáil had been in office since the 1932 general election. It lasted for 344 days.

== Nomination of Taoiseach ==
The 11th Dáil first met on 1 July 1943. In the debate on the nomination of Taoiseach, Fianna Fáil leader and outgoing Taoiseach Éamon de Valera and Fine Gael leader and former President of the Executive Council W. T. Cosgrave were both proposed. The nomination of de Valera was approved by 67 to 37. De Valera was then appointed as Taoiseach by President Douglas Hyde.

1 July 1943; Nomination of Éamon de Valera (FF) as Taoiseach; Motion proposed by Donnchadh Ó Briain and seconded by Brian Brady; Absolute majority: 70/138
Vote	Parties	Votes
Yes	Fianna Fáil (66), Independent (1)	67 / 138
No	Fine Gael (32), Independents (5)	37 / 138
Absent or Not voting	Labour Party (17), Clann na Talmhan (14), Independents (3), Ceann Comhairle (1)	34 / 138

== Members of the government ==
After his appointment as Taoiseach by the president, Éamon de Valera proposed the members of the government and they were approved by the Dáil on 2 July 1943. They were then appointed by the president.

Office	Name
Taoiseach	Éamon de Valera
Minister for External Affairs	Éamon de Valera
Tánaiste	Seán T. O'Kelly
Minister for Finance	Seán T. O'Kelly
Minister for Industry and Commerce	Seán Lemass
Minister for Supplies	Seán Lemass
Minister for Local Government and Public Health	Seán MacEntee
Minister for Agriculture	James Ryan
Minister for the Co-ordination of Defensive Measures	Frank Aiken
Minister for Education	Thomas Derrig
Minister for Justice	Gerald Boland
Minister for Defence	Oscar Traynor
Minister for Posts and Telegraphs	Patrick Little
Minister for Lands	Seán Moylan

== Parliamentary Secretaries ==
On 2 July, the government appointed parliamentary secretaries on the nomination of the Taoiseach.

Name	Office	Term
Eamon Kissane	Government Chief Whip	1943–1944
Eamon Kissane	Parliamentary Secretary to the Minister for Defence	1943–1944
Paddy Smith	Parliamentary Secretary to the Minister for Finance	1943–1944
Conn Ward	Parliamentary Secretary to the Minister for Local Government and Public Health	1943–1944
Seán O'Grady	Parliamentary Secretary to the Minister for Industry and Commerce	1943–1944
Erskine H. Childers	Parliamentary Secretary to the Minister for Local Government and Public Health	Mar.–Jun. 1944
