= Martin Corry (politician) =

Irish politician (1890–1979)

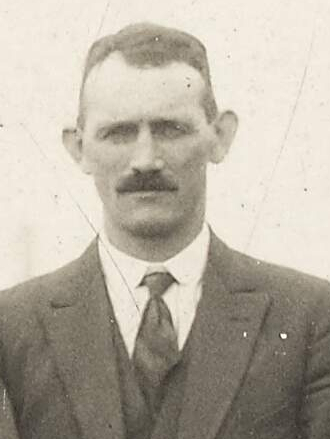
- Corry in 1927

Teachta Dála
- In office October 1961 – June 1969
- Constituency: Cork North-East
- In office July 1937 – February 1948
- Constituency: Cork South-East
- In office February 1948 – October 1961
- In office June 1927 – July 1937
- Constituency: Cork East

Personal details
- Born: 12 December 1889 Cork, Ireland
- Died: 14 February 1979 (aged 89) Cork, Ireland
- Party: Fianna Fáil
- Spouse: Margaret Fenton
- Children: 3

Military service
- Allegiance: Irish Volunteers; Irish Republican Army
- Years of service: 1917–1921
- Rank: Captain
- Battles/wars: Irish War of Independence

Martin John Corry (12 December 1889 – 14 February 1979) was an Irish farmer and long-serving backbench Teachta Dála (TD) for Fianna Fáil. He represented various County Cork constituencies covering his farm near Glounthaune, east of Cork city. He was described by Michael Leahy, his IRA commandant as the Cork No 1 Brigade's 'Chief Executioner' and is believed to have been responsible for at least 27 killings, mostly in the neighbouring parish of Knockraha. He was a founder member of Fianna Fáil in 1926, and among its first TDs after the June 1927 general election. He was returned at every election until he stood down at the 1969 general election.

Corry was active in farming issues, serving as Chairman of the Beet Growers' Association in the 1950s. In 1966, upon the resignation of Seán Lemass as Fianna Fáil leader and Taoiseach, Corry was among the Munster-based TDs who approached Jack Lynch to be a compromise candidate for the party leadership.

== Early life ==
Corry was born on 12 December 1889 on 4 Victoria Road, Cork, to Martin Corry, a Royal Irish Constabulary sergeant originally from County Clare, and Julia Mary Walsh, of Cork. In 1901, the family was living on Blackrock Road. By 1911, after his father had retired from the RIC and taken up farming, the family were living in the townland of Monaparson, near Mourne Abbey, County Cork.

== IRA activity ==
He was a member of the Mourneabbey Company of the Irish Volunteers. Corry was Company Captain of E Company, 4 battalion, 1 Cork Brigade Brigade of the Irish Republican Army (IRA) during the Irish War of Independence. He took the anti-Treaty side in the Irish Civil War and was arrested and interned in Newbridge internment camp between December 1922 and late November 1923. In 2007, it was reported that Corry's farm had been the suspected site of the execution and burial place of several people considered to be pro-British agents, spies, or informers.

Among these was Michael Williams, an ex-Royal Irish Constabulary officer abducted by the IRA "Irregulars" on 15 June 1922 for his alleged role in the shooting dead in 1920 of Tomás Mac Curtain, the Sinn Féin Lord Mayor of Cork. Corry stated he executed 27 people during the War of Independence. Corry was later awarded a pension by the Irish government under the Military Service Pensions Act, 1934 for his service with the Irish Volunteers and the IRA between 1917 and 1923.

== Dáil career ==
In a Dáil career of over forty years, Corry generally restricted himself to speaking on local issues affecting his constituents. In 1953, Corry lobbied unsuccessfully for the Faber-Castell factory planned for Fermoy to be relocated further south in his territory, to the chagrin of party colleagues in Fermoy.

Corry was a staunch advocate of Irish republicanism, strongly opposed to Partition, antipathetic to the United Kingdom, and sometimes bluntly outspoken within the Dáil chamber. In 1928, he criticised the Cumann na nGaedheal government's expenditure on the diplomatic corps, stating: "These salaries of £1,500 have to be paid so that they might squat like the nigger when he put on the black silk hat and the swallow-tail coat and went out and said he was an English gentleman." In 1930, he claimed the government had a shortage of priorities on the matter of Ireland's's finances, telling Denis Gorey: "When we see Ministers coming here and providing £300,000 for the dole for the unemployed, one wonders whether the Government is fit to govern even a tribe of African niggers. I do not believe they are"; to which Gorey responded: "Do not be abusing your relations". Corry's opposition to the Blueshirts in the early 1930s provoked an attempt to burn down his house.

In the 1938 debate on the Anglo-Irish Trade Agreement which ceded the Treaty Ports to the Irish state, Corry expressed regret that Northern Ireland remained excluded, suggesting: "I personally am in favour of storing up sufficient poison gas, so that when you get the wind in the right direction you can start at the Border and let it travel, and follow it." In a 1942 debate on exporting food to Great Britain during World War II, Corry remarked about food shortages there that "They have no more rabbits to get, and now they are on the crows", and "I would not like to see too many crows going out to feed them. I think the crows are too good for them". Patrick Giles called Corry a "bounder", and Alfie Byrne persisted in demanding an apology for the "unchristian" comments to the point of himself being suspended from the chamber.

According to Dan Keating, Corry led a group of TDs who persuaded Taoiseach Éamon de Valera to exercise clemency when Tomás Óg Mac Curtain was sentenced to death in 1940 for shooting dead a Garda. Tomás Óg Mac Curtain was an IRA member and the son of the 1920 Lord Mayor.

In 1948 and again in 1950, Corry proposed a Private member's bill to allow less restricted Sunday opening of public houses in rural areas, arguing the existing licensing law was widely flouted. The bill was withdrawn after ministerial assurance of an imminent Government-sponsored licensing bill (which did not materialise) and in the face of public condemnation from members of the Catholic hierarchy.

At the 1957 general election he achieved the rare feat of being elected on the first count without a surplus.

== County councillor ==
Corry was a member of Cork County Council, representing the Cobh electoral area, from 1924 till after 1970. He often clashed with Philip Monahan, the first county manager. Corry regarded the ability of the manager, an appointed bureaucrat, to overrule the elected Council as an affront to democracy, "the tail wagging the dog", reducing councillors to being "a cloak for his dictatorship". Corry was Chairman of the council (a position later retitled Mayor) for four years in the 1960s: 1962–1963, 1964–1965, 1967–1969. In this role in 1968 he inaugurated Cork County Hall, the tallest building in the Republic of Ireland at the time.

== Later life ==
Corry did not stand in the June 1969 general election. In May 1969, Tom Fitzpatrick had read a letter under Dáil privilege; allegedly written by Corry in 1955, it demanded £200 in cash from an engineering firm for securing a favourable County Council vote. It was later alleged that Corry was compelled to stand down to avoid the allegation embarrassing the party.

In November 1969, Corry was appointed a director of Comhlucht Siúicre Éireann Teoranta, the national sugar company, which was then a state-sponsored body.

On 26 June 1920 Corry married Margaret Fenton, a member of Cumann na mBan. They had two sons and one daughter. He died on 14 February 1979 at the regional hospital, Wilton, Cork.

According to the Dictionary of Irish Biography: "Although widely regarded as a buffoon, Corry was more able and more sinister than he appears from his outbursts in the dáil record; he represented a psychotic streak in the independence struggle and post-independence politics, widely perceived though seldom described in print."

Dáil	Election	Deputy (Party)	Deputy (Party)	Deputy (Party)	Deputy (Party)	Deputy (Party)
4th	1923	John Daly (Ind.)	Michael Hennessy (CnaG)	David Kent (Rep)	John Dinneen (FP)	Thomas O'Mahony (CnaG)
4th	1924 by-election	John Daly (Ind.)	Michael Hennessy (CnaG)	David Kent (Rep)	John Dinneen (FP)	Michael K. Noonan (CnaG)
5th	1927 (Jun)	John Daly (Ind.)	Michael Hennessy (CnaG)	David Kent (SF)	David O'Gorman (FP)	Martin Corry (FF)
6th	1927 (Sep)	John Daly (CnaG)	Michael Hennessy (CnaG)	William Kent (FF)	Edmond Carey (CnaG)	Martin Corry (FF)
7th	1932	John Daly (CnaG)	William Broderick (CnaG)	Brook Brasier (Ind.)	Patrick Murphy (FF)	Martin Corry (FF)
8th	1933	Patrick Daly (CnaG)	William Broderick (CnaG)	William Kent (NCP)	Patrick Murphy (FF)	Martin Corry (FF)
9th	1937	Constituency abolished				

Dáil	Election	Deputy (Party)	Deputy (Party)	Deputy (Party)
13th	1948	Martin Corry (FF)	Patrick O'Gorman (FG)	Seán Keane (Lab)
14th	1951	Martin Corry (FF)	Patrick O'Gorman (FG)	Seán Keane (Lab)
14th	1953 by-election	Martin Corry (FF)	Patrick O'Gorman (FG)	Richard Barry (FG)
15th	1954	Martin Corry (FF)	John Moher (FF)	Richard Barry (FG)
16th	1957	Martin Corry (FF)	John Moher (FF)	Richard Barry (FG)
17th	1961	Constituency abolished		

Dáil	Election	Deputy (Party)	Deputy (Party)	Deputy (Party)	Deputy (Party)
22nd	1981	Carey Joyce (FF)	Myra Barry (FG)	Patrick Hegarty (FG)	Joe Sherlock (SF–WP)
23rd	1982 (Feb)	Michael Ahern (FF)	Myra Barry (FG)	Patrick Hegarty (FG)	Joe Sherlock (SF–WP)
24th	1982 (Nov)	Michael Ahern (FF)	Myra Barry (FG)	Patrick Hegarty (FG)	Ned O'Keeffe (FF)
25th	1987	Michael Ahern (FF)	Joe Sherlock (WP)	Patrick Hegarty (FG)	Ned O'Keeffe (FF)
26th	1989	Michael Ahern (FF)	Joe Sherlock (WP)	Paul Bradford (FG)	Ned O'Keeffe (FF)
27th	1992	Michael Ahern (FF)	John Mulvihill (Lab)	Paul Bradford (FG)	Ned O'Keeffe (FF)
28th	1997	Michael Ahern (FF)	David Stanton (FG)	Paul Bradford (FG)	Ned O'Keeffe (FF)
29th	2002	Michael Ahern (FF)	David Stanton (FG)	Joe Sherlock (Lab)	Ned O'Keeffe (FF)
30th	2007	Michael Ahern (FF)	David Stanton (FG)	Seán Sherlock (Lab)	Ned O'Keeffe (FF)
31st	2011	Sandra McLellan (SF)	David Stanton (FG)	Seán Sherlock (Lab)	Tom Barry (FG)
32nd	2016	Pat Buckley (SF)	David Stanton (FG)	Seán Sherlock (Lab)	Kevin O'Keeffe (FF)
33rd	2020	Pat Buckley (SF)	David Stanton (FG)	Seán Sherlock (Lab)	James O'Connor (FF)
34th	2024	Pat Buckley (SF)	Noel McCarthy (FG)	Liam Quaide (SD)	James O'Connor (FF)

Dáil	Election	Deputy (Party)	Deputy (Party)	Deputy (Party)
9th	1937	Jeremiah Hurley (Lab)	Martin Corry (FF)	Brook Brasier (FG)
10th	1938	Jeremiah Hurley (Lab)	Martin Corry (FF)	Brook Brasier (FG)
11th	1943	Thomas Looney (Lab)	Martin Corry (FF)	William Broderick (FG)
12th	1944	Seán McCarthy (FF)	Martin Corry (FF)	William Broderick (FG)
13th	1948	Constituency abolished		

Dáil	Election	Deputy (Party)	Deputy (Party)	Deputy (Party)	Deputy (Party)	Deputy (Party)
17th	1961	John Moher (FF)	Martin Corry (FF)	Philip Burton (FG)	Richard Barry (FG)	Patrick McAuliffe (Lab)
18th	1965	Jerry Cronin (FF)	Martin Corry (FF)	Philip Burton (FG)	Richard Barry (FG)	Patrick McAuliffe (Lab)
19th	1969	Jerry Cronin (FF)	Seán Brosnan (FF)	Gerard Cott (FG)	Richard Barry (FG)	4 seats 1969–1981
20th	1973	Jerry Cronin (FF)	Liam Ahern (FF)	Patrick Hegarty (FG)	Richard Barry (FG)	4 seats 1969–1981
20th	1974 by-election	Jerry Cronin (FF)	Seán Brosnan (FF)	Patrick Hegarty (FG)	Richard Barry (FG)	4 seats 1969–1981
21st	1977	Jerry Cronin (FF)	Seán Brosnan (FF)	Patrick Hegarty (FG)	Richard Barry (FG)	4 seats 1969–1981
21st	1979 by-election	Jerry Cronin (FF)	Myra Barry (FG)	Patrick Hegarty (FG)	Richard Barry (FG)	4 seats 1969–1981
22nd	1981	Constituency abolished. See Cork East and Cork North-West				
