= 1943 Irish general election =

Election to the 11th Dáil

- 23 June 1943

138 seats in Dáil Éireann (Note: Including Frank Fahy, returned automatically for Galway East as outgoing Ceann Comhairle, under Art. 16.6 of the Constitution and the Electoral (Chairman of Dáil Éireann) Act 1937.) 70 seats needed for a majority
- Turnout: 74.2% ▼2.5 pp
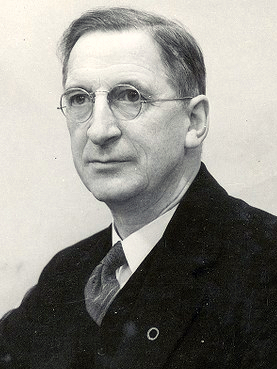

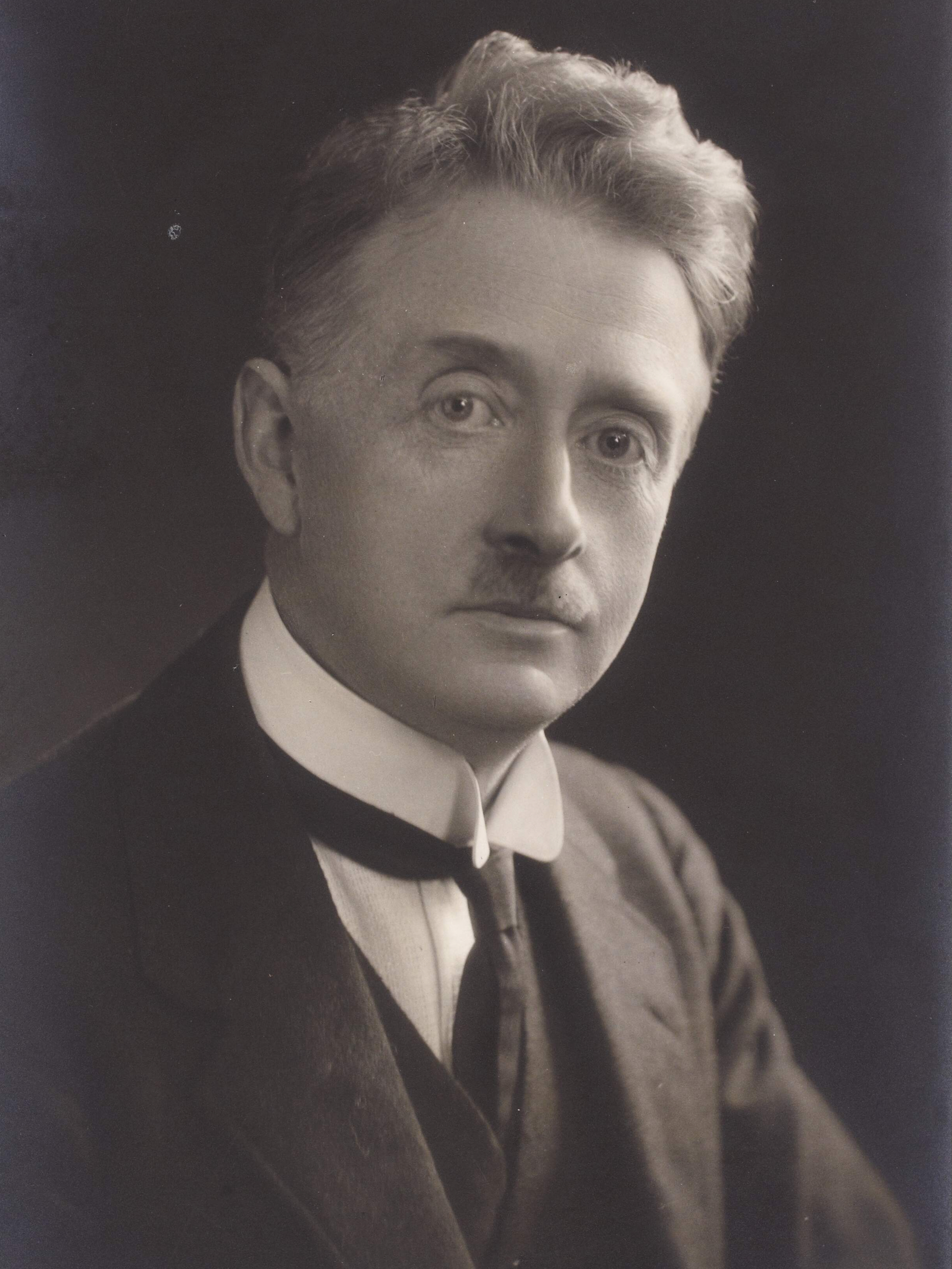

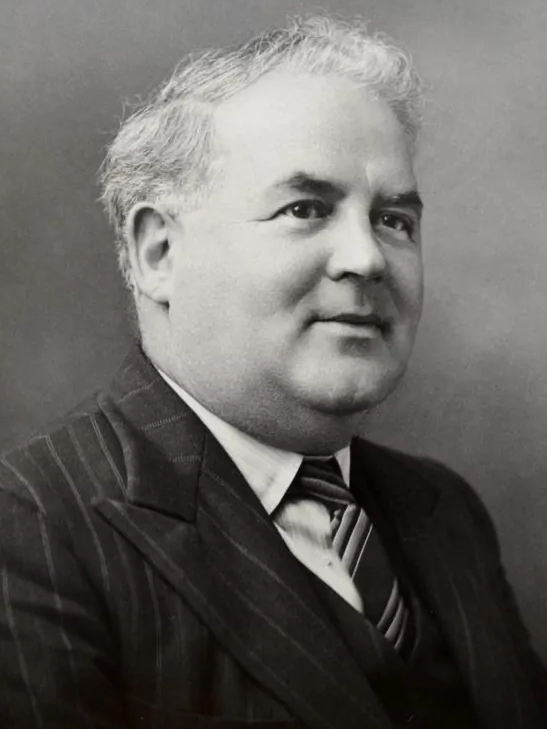

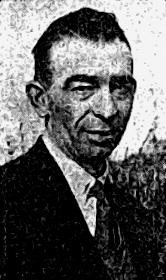
	First party	Second party
Leader	Éamon de Valera	W. T. Cosgrave
Party	Fianna Fáil	Fine Gael
Leader since	26 March 1926	September 1934
Leader's seat	Clare	Cork Borough
Last election	77 seats, 51.9%	45 seats, 33.3%
Seats won	67	32
Seat change	▼10	▼12
Popular vote	557,525	307,490
Percentage	41.9%	23.1%
Swing	▼10.0 pp	▼10.2 pp
	Third party	Fourth party
Leader	William Norton	Michael Donnellan
Party	Labour	Clann na Talmhan
Leader since	19 July 1932	29 June 1939
Leader's seat	Carlow–Kildare	Galway East
Last election	9 seats, 10.0%	New Party
Seats won	17	10
Seat change	▲8	▲10
Popular vote	208,812	130,452
Percentage	15.7%	9.0%
Swing	▲5.7 pp	New party
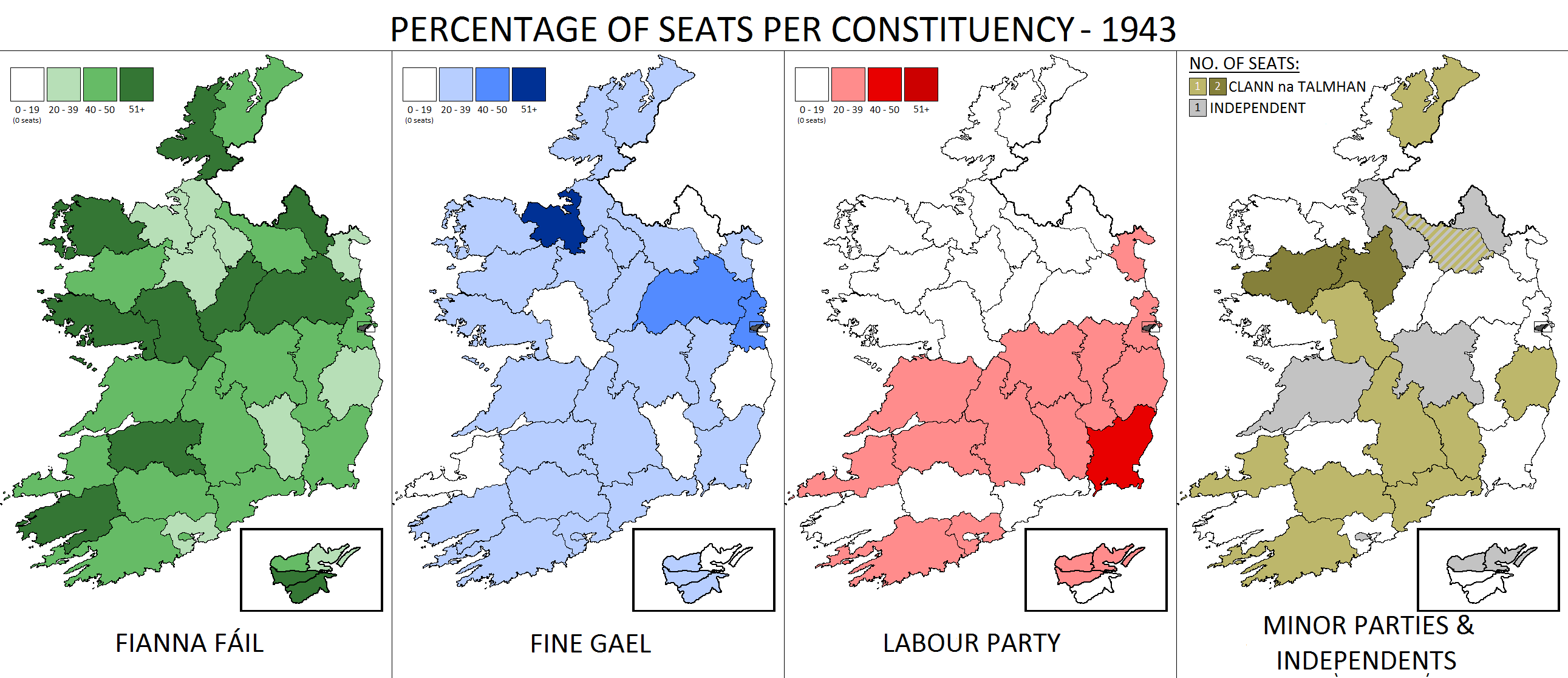
Taoiseach before election
Éamon de Valera
Fianna Fáil
Taoiseach after election
Éamon de Valera
Fianna Fáil

The 1943 Irish general election to the 11th Dáil was held on Wednesday, 23 June, having been called on 31 May by proclamation of President Douglas Hyde on the advice of Taoiseach Éamon de Valera. It took place in 34 parliamentary constituencies for 138 seats in Dáil Éireann, the house of representatives of the Oireachtas. Fianna Fáil lost its overall majority of seats. The outgoing 10th Dáil was dissolved on 26 June, although it had not met after 26 May.

The 11th Dáil met at Leinster House on 1 July to nominate the Taoiseach for appointment by the president and to approve the appointment of a new government of Ireland on the nomination of the Taoiseach. Outgoing Taoiseach Éamon de Valera was re-appointed leading a single-party Fianna Fáil government.

== Election during the emergency ==
Ireland had declared a state of emergency on 2 September 1939, arising from the Second World War. The Emergency Powers Act 1939 was in force at the time of the election campaign, and concomitant press censorship affected coverage.

In April the government had proposed to postpone the election by introducing a bill to extend the maximum term of the Dáil from five to six years; however, in the absence of support from the Fine Gael opposition, the bill was withdrawn.

As an alternative, the General Elections (Emergency Provisions) Act 1943 provided that a general election could be called without a dissolution and that the outgoing Dáil would not be dissolved until after all returns from the general election. This was in contravention of provisions of the Constitution, which require the president to dissolve the Dáil before a general election. However, this was permitted under the state of emergency.

== Result ==
Election to the 11th Dáil – 23 June 1943
Party	Leader	Seats	±	% of seats	First pref. votes	% FPv	±%
Fianna Fáil	Éamon de Valera	67	–10	48.6	557,525	41.9	–10.0
Fine Gael	W. T. Cosgrave	32	–13	23.2	307,490	23.1	–10.2
Labour	William Norton	17	+8	12.3	208,812	15.7	+5.7
Clann na Talmhan	Michael Donnellan	10 (Note: Manning (1972) notes that the Clann na Talmhan figure is often listed in error as 14, due to the inclusion of Independent Farmer TDs in the Clann na Talmhan total.)	New	7.2	130,452	9.8	–
Monetary Reform	Oliver J. Flanagan	1	New	0.7	4,377	0.3	–
Córas na Poblachta	Simon Donnelly	0	New	0	3,892	0.3	–
Ailtirí na hAiséirghe		0	New	0	3,137	0.2	–
Independent	N/A	11	+4	7.3	116,024	8.7	+4.0
Spoilt votes					16,198	—N/a	—N/a
Total		138	0	100	1,347,907	100	—N/a
Electorate/Turnout					1,816,142	74.2	—N/a

=== Voting summary ===
First preference vote
Fianna Fáil	41.86%
Fine Gael	23.09%
Labour	15.68%
Clann na Talmhan	9.80%
Others	0.86%
Independent	8.71%

=== Seats summary ===
Dáil seats
Fianna Fáil	48.55%
Fine Gael	23.19%
Labour	12.32%
Clann na Talmhan	7.25%
Monetary Reform	0.72%
Independent	7.97%

== Government formation ==
Fianna Fáil formed the 3rd government of Ireland, a minority government.

== Changes in membership ==
=== First time TDs ===
- Liam Cosgrave
- Frank Daly
- Michael Donnellan
- Michael Hilliard
- James Kilroy
- Martin O'Sullivan
- Leo Skinner
- Dan Spring
- Richard Stapleton
- Patrick Finucane

=== Retiring TDs ===
- Henry McDevitt
- Thomas Mullen

=== Defeated TDs ===
- Eamonn Cooney
- Daniel Hogan
- Frank Loughman
- Peter O'Loghlen
- Laurence Walsh
- Richard Walsh

== Seanad election ==
The election was followed by an election to the 4th Seanad.

== Sources ==
- Manning, Maurice (1972). Irish Political Parties: An Introduction. Dublin: Gill & Macmillan. ISBN 978-0-7171-0536-6.
