= Michael Sheridan (Irish politician) =

Irish politician

Teachta Dála
- In office February 1932 – October 1961
- Constituency: Cavan

Personal details
- Born: 1896 Drumcrow, Ballinagh, County Cavan, Ireland
- Died: 6 July 1970 (aged 73–74) County Cavan, Ireland
- Party: Fianna Fáil

Michael Sheridan (1896 – 6 July 1970) was an Irish Fianna Fáil politician. A farmer, he was first elected to Dáil Éireann as a Fianna Fáil Teachta Dála (TD) for the Cavan constituency at the 1932 general election. He was re-elected at each subsequent general election until 1961, when he retired from politics.

A native of Ballinagh, Sheridan came from a family prominent in the republican movement in County Cavan. He joined the Irish Volunteers in 1914, was imprisoned in 1921 during the Irish War of Independence, opposed the Anglo-Irish Treaty, and helped his brother Seán to establish Fianna Fáil in the county. His brother Tom, a Volunteer officer, was fatally wounded in an attempt to disarm a police patrol near Ballinagh on 27 May 1920. Sheridan represented Cavan in the Dáil for almost three decades, and was one of four TDs elected for the constituency at the 1948 general election, at which Fianna Fáil lost office after sixteen years in government.

== Early life ==
Sheridan was born in the townland of Drumcrow, near Ballinagh, County Cavan, the eldest of the six children of John and Margaret Sheridan. His year of birth is given as 1896 in some sources and as 1897 in his brother Seán's memoir. His siblings were Tom, Packie, Anna Mary (known as Cissie) and Seán, while another brother, James, died in infancy. The family held a small farm in a townland of 23 Catholic families, and the children attended Drumcrow National School. His maternal grandfather, Michael Delaney of Drumrooske, was a Fenian and Land League activist who served nine months in Cavan Jail for preventing a sheriff from carrying out an eviction.

The Ballinagh area of Sheridan's youth had a strong nationalist culture, with a Gaelic revival movement, local bands, an annual commemoration of the Manchester Martyrs and, in 1912, an Evicted Tenants Campaign in the neighbouring Kilmore area. According to Seán, Michael was a member of the Irish Republican Brotherhood (IRB), whose members formed the nucleus of the Irish Volunteers. On 22 March 1914, Michael was among about 100 young men who enrolled in the Volunteers at a meeting in Ballinagh called by James Dillon and Philip Baxter. His brother Packie also enrolled that day, and Tom joined the Drumbrade Company, which he later became captain of.

== Irish revolutionary period ==
In 1920, Michael's brother Tom, who commanded the Drumbrade Company, planned to hold up a police patrol near Ballinagh in order to obtain arms, with orders that it be done without loss of life. On 27 May 1920, one of the policemen opened fire and wounded both Tom and Packie. Tom died of his wounds in the Mater Hospital, Dublin, while Packie was treated at Jervis Street Hospital and then went on the run until the Truce in July 1921. Michael travelled to Dublin to identify Tom's body and arrange its return to Cavan, and the funeral at Ballinagh was attended by an estimated 5,000 people. On the night of the shooting, the Sheridan family home at Drumcrow was set on fire while the family, including Michael, were inside. They escaped.

Michael was himself arrested in early January 1921 while attending a funeral at Killeshandra. He was held for about a week at Swanlinbar and then for a month at Crumlin Road Gaol in Belfast.

During the debate on the Anglo-Irish Treaty, a meeting of the county's farmers was held at the Town Hall in Cavan. Chaired by Thomas Smith, chairman of Cavan County Council, the meeting adopted a motion calling on the county's TDs, Arthur Griffith, Seán Milroy and Peter Paul Galligan, to vote for the Treaty. Sheridan protested against the motion, stating that "they were not securing under it the freedom for which so many had sacrificed their lives". According to Seán, the Sheridan family took the anti-Treaty side, and Seán was the only member of the family actively involved against the new Free State forces in the Irish Civil War. At the August 1923 general election, Michael was among those shortlisted as the Sinn Féin candidate for Cavan, but Patrick Smith, who was then in prison, was selected and elected.

== Fianna Fáil and the Dáil ==
After Fianna Fáil was founded in 1926, Michael and Seán Sheridan worked to establish the party in Cavan. The first meeting in the county was held in Ballinagh Courthouse in July 1926, and Seán became the county organiser. Michael first stood under the party's name in the June 1927 general election, when he and Patrick Smith were the Fianna Fáil candidates in Cavan. The party's vote rose to about 9,000 first preferences, but it did not win a second seat, and the same outcome followed at the September 1927 general election. At the 1932 general election, Fianna Fáil took over 15,000 first preferences in Cavan and Sheridan was elected as the party's second TD for the county.

At the 1944 general election, Sheridan and the independent candidate Tom O'Reilly of Derries Upper, a noted Cavan Gaelic footballer, both natives of the Ballinagh area, were elected. The Longford Leader reported that Sheridan secured his seat with a comfortable margin. At the 1948 general election, held on 4 February 1948, he was one of four TDs returned for Cavan, with his party colleague Patrick Smith, the Minister for Agriculture, John Tully of Clann na Poblachta and Patrick O'Reilly of the Clann na Talmhan. Fianna Fáil lost office after sixteen years, and John A. Costello was elected Taoiseach on 18 February 1948.

== Retirement and death ==
Sheridan did not contest the 1961 general election. According to Seán, Michael had become disillusioned with the changes then overtaking Fianna Fáil, and Seán sought the party nomination to succeed his brother but was not selected at the county convention. Sheridan died on 6 July 1970.

== Political views ==
Sheridan's politics were rooted in his family's Irish republican tradition. His maternal grandfather was a Fenian and Land League activist and, according to Seán, Michael belonged to the IRB before joining the Irish Volunteers in 1914. He opposed the Anglo-Irish Treaty, arguing at a Cavan farmers' meeting that it did not secure "the freedom for which so many had sacrificed their lives". Seán gave the Oath of Allegiance and the prospect of separation from neighbouring County Fermanagh as the family's reasons for rejecting the Treaty. Seán recalled that he and other Cavan republicans backed Éamon de Valera's decision to enter the Dáil in 1927, after de Valera signed the oath and described it as an "empty formula".

In later life, Seán recorded that Michael felt out of place among a new generation of Fianna Fáil deputies who, in his view, had little interest in the party's republican background, and he considered that it was better for veterans of his generation to leave politics. His colleague Dan Breen disagreed, telling him that "it is more important now than ever that we stay on".

== Personal life ==
Sheridan was the eldest of six children of John and Margaret Sheridan, who died in 1936 and 1937 respectively. His brother Packie built a two-storey house at Drumcrow to replace the family's old thatched house. Around 1920, Michael was involved with the Ballinagh Dramatic Society, and after the Civil War in 1923 he worked at the Cavan office of the solicitor P.N. Smith. During the Second World War, he stayed with Seán, then an army officer living in Rathfarnham, on his weekly visits to Dublin for Dáil sittings.

Dáil	Election	Deputy (Party)	Deputy (Party)	Deputy (Party)	Deputy (Party)
2nd	1921	Arthur Griffith (SF)	Peter Paul Galligan (SF)	Seán Milroy (SF)	3 seats 1921–1923
3rd	1922	Arthur Griffith (PT-SF)	Walter L. Cole (PT-SF)	Seán Milroy (PT-SF)	3 seats 1921–1923
4th	1923	Patrick Smith (Rep)	John James Cole (Ind.)	Seán Milroy (CnaG)	Patrick Baxter (FP)
4th	1925 by-election	Patrick Smith (Rep)	John James Cole (Ind.)	John Joe O'Reilly (CnaG)	Patrick Baxter (FP)
5th	1927 (Jun)	Patrick Smith (FF)	John O'Hanlon (Ind.)	John Joe O'Reilly (CnaG)	Patrick Baxter (FP)
6th	1927 (Sep)	Patrick Smith (FF)	John O'Hanlon (Ind.)	John Joe O'Reilly (CnaG)	John James Cole (Ind.)
7th	1932	Patrick Smith (FF)	John O'Hanlon (Ind.)	John Joe O'Reilly (CnaG)	Michael Sheridan (FF)
8th	1933	Patrick Smith (FF)	Patrick McGovern (NCP)	John Joe O'Reilly (CnaG)	Michael Sheridan (FF)
9th	1937	Patrick Smith (FF)	Patrick McGovern (FG)	John James Cole (Ind.)	Michael Sheridan (FF)
10th	1938	Patrick Smith (FF)	Patrick McGovern (FG)	John James Cole (Ind.)	Michael Sheridan (FF)
11th	1943	Patrick Smith (FF)	Patrick O'Reilly (CnaT)	John James Cole (Ind.)	Michael Sheridan (FF)
12th	1944	Patrick Smith (FF)	Patrick O'Reilly (CnaT)	Tom O'Reilly (Ind.)	Michael Sheridan (FF)
13th	1948	Patrick Smith (FF)	John Tully (CnaP)	Patrick O'Reilly (Ind.)	Michael Sheridan (FF)
14th	1951	Patrick Smith (FF)	John Tully (CnaP)	Patrick O'Reilly (FG)	Michael Sheridan (FF)
15th	1954	Patrick Smith (FF)	John Tully (CnaP)	Patrick O'Reilly (FG)	Michael Sheridan (FF)
16th	1957	Patrick Smith (FF)	John Tully (CnaP)	Patrick O'Reilly (FG)	Michael Sheridan (FF)
17th	1961	Patrick Smith (FF)	Séamus Dolan (FF)	Patrick O'Reilly (FG)	3 seats 1961–1977
18th	1965	Patrick Smith (FF)	John Tully (CnaP)	Tom Fitzpatrick (FG)	3 seats 1961–1977
19th	1969	Patrick Smith (FF)	Patrick O'Reilly (FG)	Tom Fitzpatrick (FG)	3 seats 1961–1977
20th	1973	Patrick Smith (FF)	John Wilson (FF)	Tom Fitzpatrick (FG)	3 seats 1961–1977
21st	1977	Constituency abolished. See Cavan–Monaghan			
