= John Copeland Cole =

Irish politician (died 1987)

Senator
- In office 22 May 1957 – 5 November 1969
- Constituency: Nominated by the Taoiseach

Personal details
- Died: 23 April 1987
- Party: Independent
- Parent: John James Cole (father)
- Relatives: Thomas Loftus Cole (uncle)

John Copeland Cole (died 23 April 1987) was an Irish politician. He was an independent member of Seanad Éireann from 1957 to 1969. He was nominated by the Taoiseach Éamon de Valera in 1957 to the 9th Seanad. He was nominated by Seán Lemass in 1961 and 1965 to the 10th and 11th Seanads respectively. He did not contest the 1969 Seanad election.

He was a member of the Orange Order and was grand master of the County Cavan lodge. His father John James Cole was a Teachta Dála (TD) for the Cavan constituency, elected on five occasions between 1923 and 1943. His uncle Thomas Loftus Cole, was an MP for Belfast East.

== See also ==
- Families in the Oireachtas
