= Séamus Dolan =

Irish politician (1914–2010)

Cathaoirleach of Seanad Éireann
- In office 27 October 1977 – 8 October 1981
- Preceded by: James Dooge
- Succeeded by: Charles McDonald

Senator
- In office 1 June 1973 – 13 May 1982
- In office 23 June 1965 – 5 November 1969
- Constituency: Labour Panel

Teachta Dála
- In office October 1961 – April 1965
- Constituency: Cavan

Personal details
- Born: 10 December 1914 Blacklion, County Cavan, Ireland
- Died: 10 August 2010 (aged 95) County Cavan, Ireland
- Party: Fianna Fáil

Séamus Dolan (10 December 1914 – 10 August 2010) was an Irish Fianna Fáil politician. He was a Teachta Dála (TD) from 1961 to 1965, and a Senator from 1965 to 1969 and from 1973 to 1982. He was Cathaoirleach of Seanad Éireann from 1977 to 1981.

Born in Gubaveeney, near Blacklion in County Cavan, he was a farmer and national school teacher before entering politics. Dolan was elected in 1961 to Dáil Éireann for the Cavan constituency (which he had contested unsuccessfully at the 1954 and 1957 elections). He lost his seat at the 1965 general election, and although he stood in the next two general elections (in 1969 and 1973), he never returned to the Dáil.

However, after his 1965 defeat, he was elected to the 11th Seanad on the Labour Panel. He did not seek re-election in 1969, but was returned in 1973 to the 13th Seanad. From 1977 to 1981 he was Cathaoirleach of the 14th Seanad (1981–1982) and as Leas-Chathaoirleach in the 15th Seanad.

He was a fluent Irish speaker (Gaeilgóir) and dedicated much of his time to promoting the language, as well as teaching its value and importance in his day. He was one of the few native Irish speakers in County Cavan and raised his family through the medium.

Séamus Dolan died on 10 August 2010.

Oireachtas
Preceded by James Dooge	Cathaoirleach of Seanad Éireann; 1977–1981	Succeeded by Charles McDonald

Dáil	Election	Deputy (Party)	Deputy (Party)	Deputy (Party)	Deputy (Party)
2nd	1921	Arthur Griffith (SF)	Paul Galligan (SF)	Seán Milroy (SF)	3 seats 1921–1923
3rd	1922	Arthur Griffith (PT-SF)	Walter L. Cole (PT-SF)	Seán Milroy (PT-SF)	3 seats 1921–1923
4th	1923	Patrick Smith (Rep)	John James Cole (Ind.)	Seán Milroy (CnaG)	Patrick Baxter (FP)
4th	1925 by-election	Patrick Smith (Rep)	John James Cole (Ind.)	John Joe O'Reilly (CnaG)	Patrick Baxter (FP)
5th	1927 (Jun)	Paddy Smith (FF)	John O'Hanlon (Ind.)	John Joe O'Reilly (CnaG)	Patrick Baxter (FP)
6th	1927 (Sep)	Paddy Smith (FF)	John O'Hanlon (Ind.)	John Joe O'Reilly (CnaG)	John James Cole (Ind.)
7th	1932	Paddy Smith (FF)	John O'Hanlon (Ind.)	John Joe O'Reilly (CnaG)	Michael Sheridan (FF)
8th	1933	Paddy Smith (FF)	Patrick McGovern (NCP)	John Joe O'Reilly (CnaG)	Michael Sheridan (FF)
9th	1937	Paddy Smith (FF)	Patrick McGovern (FG)	John James Cole (Ind.)	Michael Sheridan (FF)
10th	1938	Paddy Smith (FF)	Patrick McGovern (FG)	John James Cole (Ind.)	Michael Sheridan (FF)
11th	1943	Paddy Smith (FF)	Patrick O'Reilly (CnaT)	John James Cole (Ind.)	Michael Sheridan (FF)
12th	1944	Paddy Smith (FF)	Patrick O'Reilly (CnaT)	Tom O'Reilly (Ind.)	Michael Sheridan (FF)
13th	1948	Paddy Smith (FF)	John Tully (CnaP)	Patrick O'Reilly (Ind.)	Michael Sheridan (FF)
14th	1951	Paddy Smith (FF)	John Tully (CnaP)	Patrick O'Reilly (FG)	Michael Sheridan (FF)
15th	1954	Paddy Smith (FF)	John Tully (CnaP)	Patrick O'Reilly (FG)	Michael Sheridan (FF)
16th	1957	Paddy Smith (FF)	John Tully (CnaP)	Patrick O'Reilly (FG)	Michael Sheridan (FF)
17th	1961	Paddy Smith (FF)	Séamus Dolan (FF)	Patrick O'Reilly (FG)	3 seats 1961–1977
18th	1965	Paddy Smith (FF)	John Tully (CnaP)	Tom Fitzpatrick (FG)	3 seats 1961–1977
19th	1969	Paddy Smith (FF)	Patrick O'Reilly (FG)	Tom Fitzpatrick (FG)	3 seats 1961–1977
20th	1973	Paddy Smith (FF)	John Wilson (FF)	Tom Fitzpatrick (FG)	3 seats 1961–1977
21st	1977	Constituency abolished. See Cavan–Monaghan			
