= John Joe O'Reilly (politician) =

Irish politician (1881–1967)

Teachta Dála
- In office March 1925 – July 1937
- Constituency: Cavan

Personal details
- Born: 24 April 1881 County Leitrim, Ireland
- Died: 28 December 1967 (aged 86) County Leitrim, Ireland
- Party: Cumann na nGaedheal; Fine Gael

John Joseph O'Reilly (24 April 1881 – 28 December 1967) was an Irish Cumann na nGaedheal and later Fine Gael politician and physician. He was born in Carrigallen, County Leitrim and practised as a GP in Tullyvin, County Cavan.

He was first elected to Dáil Éireann as a Cumann na nGaedheal Teachta Dála (TD) at the March 1925 by-election for the Cavan constituency. He was re-elected at each subsequent election until the 1937 general election when he lost his seat to John James Cole, an independent Unionist.

Dáil	Election	Deputy (Party)	Deputy (Party)	Deputy (Party)	Deputy (Party)
2nd	1921	Arthur Griffith (SF)	Paul Galligan (SF)	Seán Milroy (SF)	3 seats 1921–1923
3rd	1922	Arthur Griffith (PT-SF)	Walter L. Cole (PT-SF)	Seán Milroy (PT-SF)	3 seats 1921–1923
4th	1923	Patrick Smith (Rep)	John James Cole (Ind.)	Seán Milroy (CnaG)	Patrick Baxter (FP)
4th	1925 by-election	Patrick Smith (Rep)	John James Cole (Ind.)	John Joe O'Reilly (CnaG)	Patrick Baxter (FP)
5th	1927 (Jun)	Paddy Smith (FF)	John O'Hanlon (Ind.)	John Joe O'Reilly (CnaG)	Patrick Baxter (FP)
6th	1927 (Sep)	Paddy Smith (FF)	John O'Hanlon (Ind.)	John Joe O'Reilly (CnaG)	John James Cole (Ind.)
7th	1932	Paddy Smith (FF)	John O'Hanlon (Ind.)	John Joe O'Reilly (CnaG)	Michael Sheridan (FF)
8th	1933	Paddy Smith (FF)	Patrick McGovern (NCP)	John Joe O'Reilly (CnaG)	Michael Sheridan (FF)
9th	1937	Paddy Smith (FF)	Patrick McGovern (FG)	John James Cole (Ind.)	Michael Sheridan (FF)
10th	1938	Paddy Smith (FF)	Patrick McGovern (FG)	John James Cole (Ind.)	Michael Sheridan (FF)
11th	1943	Paddy Smith (FF)	Patrick O'Reilly (CnaT)	John James Cole (Ind.)	Michael Sheridan (FF)
12th	1944	Paddy Smith (FF)	Patrick O'Reilly (CnaT)	Tom O'Reilly (Ind.)	Michael Sheridan (FF)
13th	1948	Paddy Smith (FF)	John Tully (CnaP)	Patrick O'Reilly (Ind.)	Michael Sheridan (FF)
14th	1951	Paddy Smith (FF)	John Tully (CnaP)	Patrick O'Reilly (FG)	Michael Sheridan (FF)
15th	1954	Paddy Smith (FF)	John Tully (CnaP)	Patrick O'Reilly (FG)	Michael Sheridan (FF)
16th	1957	Paddy Smith (FF)	John Tully (CnaP)	Patrick O'Reilly (FG)	Michael Sheridan (FF)
17th	1961	Paddy Smith (FF)	Séamus Dolan (FF)	Patrick O'Reilly (FG)	3 seats 1961–1977
18th	1965	Paddy Smith (FF)	John Tully (CnaP)	Tom Fitzpatrick (FG)	3 seats 1961–1977
19th	1969	Paddy Smith (FF)	Patrick O'Reilly (FG)	Tom Fitzpatrick (FG)	3 seats 1961–1977
20th	1973	Paddy Smith (FF)	John Wilson (FF)	Tom Fitzpatrick (FG)	3 seats 1961–1977
21st	1977	Constituency abolished. See Cavan–Monaghan			
