= Pádraig Faulkner =

Irish politician (1918–2012)

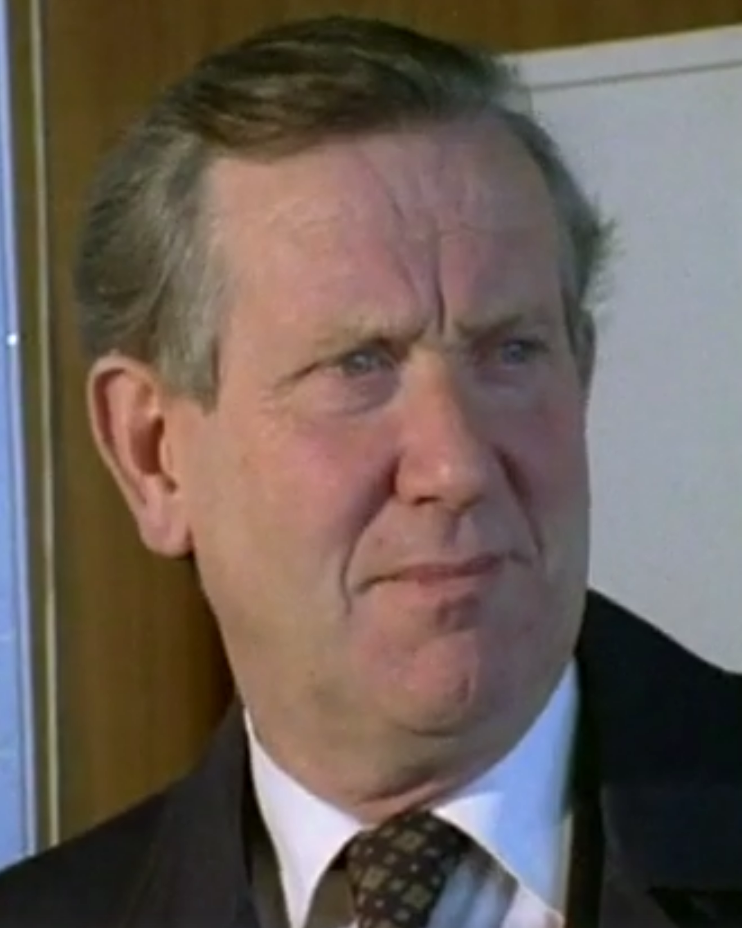
- Faulkner in 1980

Ceann Comhairle of Dáil Éireann
- In office 16 October 1980 – 30 June 1981
- Deputy: Seán Browne
- Preceded by: Joseph Brennan
- Succeeded by: John O'Connell

Minister for Defence
- In office 12 December 1979 – 15 October 1980
- Taoiseach: Jack Lynch; Charles Haughey
- Preceded by: Bobby Molloy
- Succeeded by: Sylvester Barrett

Minister for Posts and Telegraphs
- In office 5 July 1977 – 11 December 1979
- Taoiseach: Jack Lynch
- Preceded by: Conor Cruise O'Brien
- Succeeded by: Albert Reynolds

Minister for Tourism and Transport
- In office 5 July 1977 – 11 December 1979
- Taoiseach: Jack Lynch
- Preceded by: Tom Fitzpatrick
- Succeeded by: George Colley

Minister for Education
- In office 2 July 1969 – 14 March 1973
- Taoiseach: Jack Lynch
- Preceded by: Brian Lenihan
- Succeeded by: Richard Burke

Minister for the Gaeltacht
- In office 27 March 1968 – 2 July 1969
- Taoiseach: Jack Lynch
- Preceded by: Mícheál Ó Móráin
- Succeeded by: George Colley

Minister for Lands
- In office 27 March 1968 – 2 July 1969
- Taoiseach: Jack Lynch
- Preceded by: Mícheál Ó Móráin
- Succeeded by: Seán Flanagan

Parliamentary Secretary
- 1965–1968: Gaeltacht

Teachta Dála
- In office March 1957 – February 1987
- Constituency: Louth

Personal details
- Born: 12 March 1918 Dundalk, County Louth, Ireland
- Died: 1 June 2012 (aged 94) Drogheda, County Louth, Ireland
- Party: Fianna Fáil
- Spouse: Kitty Landy (m. 1948)
- Children: 6
- Education: St Patrick's College, Dublin

Pádraig Faulkner (12 March 1918 – 1 June 2012) was an Irish Fianna Fáil politician who served as Ceann Comhairle of Dáil Éireann from 1980 to 1981, Minister for Defence 1979 to 1980, Minister for Posts and Telegraphs and Minister for Tourism and Transport from 1977 to 1979, Minister for Education from 1969 to 1973, Minister for the Gaeltacht and Minister for Lands from 1968 to 1969 and Parliamentary Secretary to the Minister for the Gaeltacht from 1965 to 1968. He served as a Teachta Dála (TD) for the Louth constituency from 1957 to 1987.

Faulkner was born in Dundalk, County Louth, in 1918. He was educated at Dundalk CBS and St Patrick's College of Education in Drumcondra, Dublin, where he qualified as a national school teacher. Faulkner grew up in Dunleer in south Louth, where his father was a strong supporter of Fine Gael, while his mother supported the more Republican and working-class Fianna Fáil. He favoured his mother's political outlook and joined Fianna Fáil. Faulkner unsuccessfully contested the Louth by-election in 1954 but at the 1957 general election, he was elected to Dáil Éireann winning a second seat for the party with Frank Aiken as they returned to Government.

In 1965, Faulkner was appointed Parliamentary Secretary to the Minister for the Gaeltacht by the Taoiseach, Seán Lemass. He was appointed to the Cabinet by the new Taoiseach Jack Lynch in 1968 and served in every Fianna Fáil-led government until 1980. During the Arms Crisis he was a Lynch loyalist. He was one of a number of TDs and Senators who gathered in Dublin Airport to welcome Lynch home from the United States after the defendants had been found not guilty at the Arms Trial. This gathering has been arranged by his constituency colleague, Frank Aiken. Nine years later in 1979 one of those defendants, Charles Haughey, was elected Taoiseach. Faulkner was retained in the Cabinet until 1980 as Minister of Defence when he was elected Ceann Comhairle of Dáil Éireann. It was rumoured by various political correspondents that George Colley insisted that he personally appoint the Ministers for Defence and Justice in the 1979 Cabinet. Faulkner rebuts this in his autobiography. Haughey as a former Army Officer took offence to that claim from certain sections of the media that he would subvert the Army as his father had died as an Army Officer himself.

Faulkner was subsequently appointed to the Council of State by President Patrick Hillery in 1984.

Following the election of a new Ceann Comhairle immediately after the 1981 general election, he retired to the backbenches before retiring from politics at the 1987 general election. In a Dáil career that spanned thirty years, his most notable achievements include the introduction of the legislation to establish two commercial semi-State companies, An Post and Telecom Éireann. He also played a notable role in the establishment of the Regional College of Technology in Dundalk now Dundalk Institute of Technology and the Faulkner Building is named after him as a result. Faulkner, while Minister for Transport & Power, also oversaw part of the introduction of the Dublin Area Rapid Transit.

He died at the age of 94, on 1 June 2012 in Dunleer.

Political offices
New office	Parliamentary Secretary to the Minister for the Gaeltacht; 1965–1968	Office abolished
Preceded by Mícheál Ó Móráin	Minister for Lands; 1968–1969	Succeeded by Seán Flanagan
Preceded by Mícheál Ó Móráin	Minister for the Gaeltacht; 1968–1969	Succeeded by George Colley
Preceded by Brian Lenihan	Minister for Education; 1969–1973	Succeeded by Richard Burke
Preceded by Conor Cruise O'Brien	Minister for Posts and Telegraphs; 1977–1979	Succeeded by Albert Reynolds
Preceded by Tom Fitzpatrick	Minister for Tourism and Transport; 1977–1979	Succeeded by George Colley
Preceded by Bobby Molloy	Minister for Defence; 1979–1980	Succeeded by Sylvester Barrett
Preceded by Joseph Brennan	Ceann Comhairle of Dáil Éireann; 1980–1981	Succeeded by John O'Connell

Dáil	Election	Deputy (Party)	Deputy (Party)	Deputy (Party)	Deputy (Party)	Deputy (Party)
4th	1923	Frank Aiken (Rep)	Peter Hughes (CnaG)	James Murphy (CnaG)	3 seats until 1977	
5th	1927 (Jun)	Frank Aiken (FF)	James Coburn (NL)	James Murphy (CnaG)	3 seats until 1977	
6th	1927 (Sep)	Frank Aiken (FF)	James Coburn (NL)	James Murphy (CnaG)	3 seats until 1977	
7th	1932	Frank Aiken (FF)	James Coburn (Ind.)	James Murphy (CnaG)	3 seats until 1977	
8th	1933	Frank Aiken (FF)	James Coburn (Ind.)	James Murphy (CnaG)	3 seats until 1977	
9th	1937	Frank Aiken (FF)	James Coburn (FG)	Laurence Walsh (FF)	3 seats until 1977	
10th	1938	Frank Aiken (FF)	James Coburn (FG)	Laurence Walsh (FF)	3 seats until 1977	
11th	1943	Frank Aiken (FF)	James Coburn (FG)	Roddy Connolly (Lab)	3 seats until 1977	
12th	1944	Frank Aiken (FF)	James Coburn (FG)	Laurence Walsh (FF)	3 seats until 1977	
13th	1948	Frank Aiken (FF)	James Coburn (FG)	Roddy Connolly (Lab)	3 seats until 1977	
14th	1951	Frank Aiken (FF)	James Coburn (FG)	Laurence Walsh (FF)	3 seats until 1977	
14th	1954 by-election	Frank Aiken (FF)	George Coburn (FG)	Laurence Walsh (FF)	3 seats until 1977	
15th	1954	Frank Aiken (FF)	George Coburn (FG)	Paddy Donegan (FG)	3 seats until 1977	
16th	1957	Frank Aiken (FF)	George Coburn (FG)	Pádraig Faulkner (Note: Faulker served as Ceann Comhairle in the 21st Dáil from 1977 to 1981, and was returned automatically at the 1981 election.) (FF)	3 seats until 1977	
17th	1961	Frank Aiken (FF)	Paddy Donegan (FG)	Pádraig Faulkner (FF)	3 seats until 1977	
18th	1965	Frank Aiken (FF)	Paddy Donegan (FG)	Pádraig Faulkner (FF)	3 seats until 1977	
19th	1969	Frank Aiken (FF)	Paddy Donegan (FG)	Pádraig Faulkner (FF)	3 seats until 1977	
20th	1973	Joseph Farrell (FF)	Paddy Donegan (FG)	Pádraig Faulkner (FF)	3 seats until 1977	
21st	1977	Joseph Farrell (FF)	Paddy Donegan (FG)	Pádraig Faulkner (FF)	Eddie Filgate (FF)	4 seats 1977–2011
22nd	1981	Paddy Agnew (AHB)	Bernard Markey (FG)	Pádraig Faulkner (FF)	Eddie Filgate (FF)	4 seats 1977–2011
23rd	1982 (Feb)	Thomas Bellew (FF)	Bernard Markey (FG)	Pádraig Faulkner (FF)	Eddie Filgate (FF)	4 seats 1977–2011
24th	1982 (Nov)	Michael Bell (Lab)	Brendan McGahon (FG)	Pádraig Faulkner (FF)	Séamus Kirk (Note: Kirk served as Ceann Comhairle in the 30th Dáil from 2009 to 2011, and was returned automatically at the 2011 election.) (FF)	4 seats 1977–2011
25th	1987	Michael Bell (Lab)	Brendan McGahon (FG)	Dermot Ahern (FF)	Séamus Kirk (FF)	4 seats 1977–2011
26th	1989	Michael Bell (Lab)	Brendan McGahon (FG)	Dermot Ahern (FF)	Séamus Kirk (FF)	4 seats 1977–2011
27th	1992	Michael Bell (Lab)	Brendan McGahon (FG)	Dermot Ahern (FF)	Séamus Kirk (FF)	4 seats 1977–2011
28th	1997	Michael Bell (Lab)	Brendan McGahon (FG)	Dermot Ahern (FF)	Séamus Kirk (FF)	4 seats 1977–2011
29th	2002	Arthur Morgan (SF)	Fergus O'Dowd (FG)	Dermot Ahern (FF)	Séamus Kirk (FF)	4 seats 1977–2011
30th	2007	Arthur Morgan (SF)	Fergus O'Dowd (FG)	Dermot Ahern (FF)	Séamus Kirk (FF)	4 seats 1977–2011
31st	2011	Gerry Adams (SF)	Fergus O'Dowd (FG)	Ged Nash (Lab)	Séamus Kirk (FF)	Peter Fitzpatrick (FG)
32nd	2016	Gerry Adams (SF)	Fergus O'Dowd (FG)	Declan Breathnach (FF)	Imelda Munster (SF)	Peter Fitzpatrick (FG)
33rd	2020	Ruairí Ó Murchú (SF)	Fergus O'Dowd (FG)	Ged Nash (Lab)	Imelda Munster (SF)	Peter Fitzpatrick (Ind.)
34th	2024	Ruairí Ó Murchú (SF)	Paula Butterly (FG)	Ged Nash (Lab)	Joanna Byrne (SF)	Erin McGreehan (FF)
