= John O'Connell (Dublin politician) =

Irish politician (1927–2013)

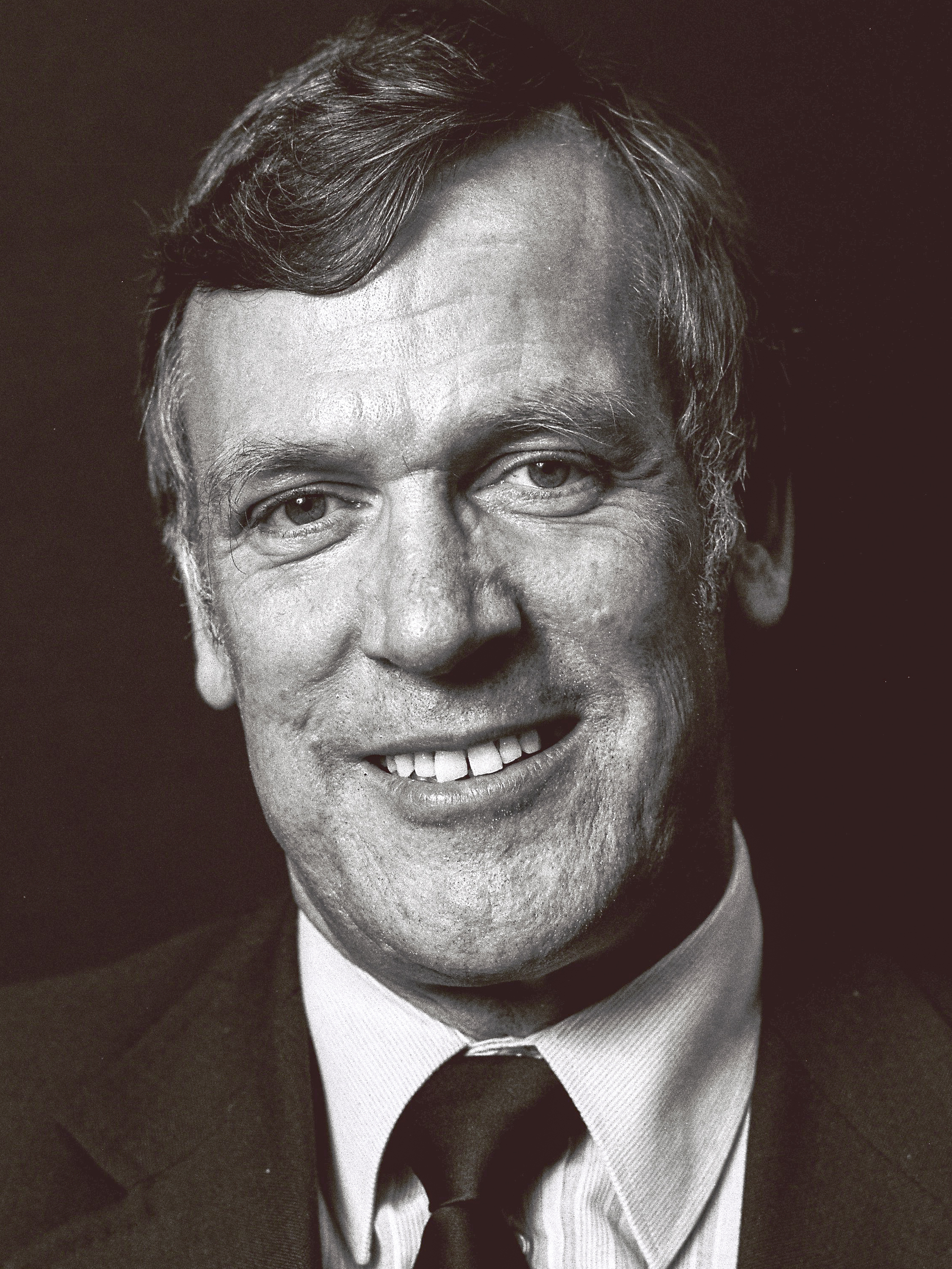
- O'Connell in 1979

Minister for Health
- In office 11 January 1992 – 12 January 1993
- Taoiseach: Albert Reynolds
- Preceded by: Mary O'Rourke
- Succeeded by: Brendan Howlin

Ceann Comhairle of Dáil Éireann
- In office 30 June 1981 – 14 December 1982
- Deputy: Jim Tunney
- Preceded by: Pádraig Faulkner
- Succeeded by: Thomas J. Fitzpatrick

Teachta Dála
- In office June 1989 – 22 February 1993
- In office June 1981 – June 1987
- Constituency: Dublin South-Central
- In office June 1977 – June 1981
- Constituency: Dublin Ballyfermot
- In office April 1965 – June 1977
- Constituency: Dublin South-West

Senator
- In office 25 April 1987 – 15 June 1989
- Constituency: Nominated by the Taoiseach

Member of the European Parliament
- In office 1 July 1979 – 20 October 1981
- Constituency: Dublin

Personal details
- Born: 20 January 1927 Dublin, Ireland
- Died: 8 March 2013 (aged 86) Ranelagh, Dublin, Ireland
- Party: Fianna Fáil
- Other political affiliations: Labour Party (to 1981); Independent (1981–1985)
- Spouse: Elizabeth (Lilian) Gunning (m. 1956; died 2002)
- Children: 7
- Education: Royal College of Surgeons

John Francis O'Connell (20 January 1927 – 8 March 2013) was an Irish politician who served as Minister for Health from 1992 to 1993 and Ceann Comhairle of Dáil Éireann from 1981 to 1982. He served as a Teachta Dála (TD) from 1965 to 1987 and from 1989 to 1993. He served as a Member of the European Parliament (MEP) for the Dublin constituency from 1979 to 1981. He was a Senator from 1987 to 1989, after being nominated by the Taoiseach.

== Early life ==
O'Connell was born on 20 January 1927 in the Liberties in Dublin and grew up in Drumcondra in grinding poverty. He was the fifth child of six, including three sons and three daughters, to John O'Connell, a First World War veteran who had lost an eye, and Mary (née Smith), who was in poor health, unable to read, and had one leg distended by illness. O'Connell's family experienced several early losses: his eldest brother died in 1931 from heart failure caused by rheumatic fever, a sister died of tuberculosis at age fifteen, and another brother died on active service with the Royal Air Force during the Second World War.

O'Connell attended St Patrick's National School in Drumcondra and the Christian Brothers' secondary school attached to St Vincent's Orphanage, Glasnevin. His mother obtained fee exemptions by ensuring her children performed at the top of their classes. Determined to become a doctor, O'Connell faced initial resistance: his local GP refused to provide a college application reference, claiming that medicine was not a career for the poor. He financed his education through a succession of menial jobs while studying at the Royal College of Surgeons in Ireland.

After qualifying as a doctor in 1955, O'Connell married Elizabeth (Lillian) Gunning from Drimnagh, and moved to the United States, where he practised at a Catholic hospital in Ohio for three years. Returning to Dublin, he briefly worked as a registrar at the Mater Hospital before establishing a highly successful general practice near the South Circular Road in 1958. In his early practice, he focused on social medicine, providing treatment for patients affected by overcrowding, poverty, and unemployment, which he later cited as a motivating factor for entering politics.

In 1960, O'Connell founded the pharmaceutical directory Monthly Index of Medical Specialities (MIMS), inspired by the need for accessible prescribing information he had observed in the United States. MIMS became widely used by doctors and developed into a successful international brand. He also established the Irish Medical Times in January 1967, serving as titular editor alongside Dr Robert Towers (1927–2010). In 1972, he sold a stake in Irish Medical Publications (IMP) to Haymarket Publishing Group but retained editorial control. He later profited from subsequent sales of IMP to Jefferson Smurfit in 1988 and Reed Elsevier in 2000. By 1972, O'Connell had acquired a Victorian mansion in Inchicore, Dublin.

== Political career ==
=== Labour ===
He began his political career when he was elected to Dáil Éireann as a Labour Party TD for Dublin South-West at the 1965 general election. He held a seat for the party in the constituency until a revision of constituencies in 1977, when he was elected for Dublin Ballyfermot. At the first direct elections in 1979 to the European Parliament, he was elected with his running mate Michael O'Leary to the Dublin constituency.

In 1963, O'Connell joined the Labour Party in response to chronic unemployment and poverty, and published and edited the party paper Labour News with Proinsias Mac Aonghusa. Using his medical practice as a platform, he financed a personal political organisation based on paid canvassers and private opinion polls while generally refusing political donations. In the 1965 general election, he was elected as a Labour TD for Dublin South-West. His constituency became largely associated with him, challenged only briefly by Labour TD Seán Dunne in the 1969 Irish general election. He was elected to the Dáil nine times amid several constituency boundary revisions, representing Dublin South-West (1965–77), Dublin Ballyfermot (1977–81), and Dublin South-Central (1981–87 and 1989–93). He also served as an MEP for Dublin (1979–81) and as a member of Dublin Corporation, attributing his limited attendance at the European Parliament to a fear of flying and eventually resigning his seat there.

Although widely supported by his constituents, O'Connell's volatility and emphasis on problem-solving over party coherence led to distrust among colleagues. He was highly active in the Dáil and drew media attention by sending a telegram to the Pope regarding homeless constituents living in Griffith Barracks. His advocacy contributed to securing compensation for Irish children born with deformities after their mothers received thalidomide during pregnancy. His election as a Labour TD coincided with the party's shift from conservative Catholic labourism toward a more secular and professional social democracy. He was a frequent critic of the Irish Catholic hierarchy and consistently supported the legalisation of contraception, both as a TD and as owner-editor of the Irish Medical Times.

O'Connell engaged in labour dispute resolution, mediating between CIÉ and the breakaway National Busmen's Union, and was the only Labour TD to oppose the expulsion of Senator Jack McQuillan over a trade union split. After 1969, he undertook private peace initiatives in Northern Ireland, meeting with representatives from both sides during the Troubles. Although an Irish republican, he expressed respect for the forthrightness of the Ulster Defence Association leadership and Ian Paisley. In 1972, he arranged meetings between British opposition leader Harold Wilson and Provisional IRA representatives (Dáithí Ó Conaill and Seán Mac Stíofáin) in Dublin (March) and Luton (July), actions which attracted criticism from some public figures concerned about encouraging paramilitary activity. That October, he attempted to counter Conor Cruise O'Brien's criticism of SDLP policy.

As Labour spokesman on social welfare, O'Connell played a role in shifting the party toward coalition government in May–June 1972. When the Fine Gael–Labour alliance won the 1973 Irish general election, he was not appointed Minister for Health; the portfolio was retained by party leader Brendan Corish. O'Connell declined an offer to become Corish's special adviser. He was among the few Labour TDs to oppose disciplining David Thornley for attending a Sinn Féin demonstration and criticised coalition security legislation. From 1977 to 1979, he served as Labour spokesman for health, criticising Charles Haughey as Minister for Health over legislation regulating prescription-only access to contraception for married couples, although by the mid-1970s a friendship developed between O'Connell and Haughey, leading some within Labour to suggest he moderated his criticism.

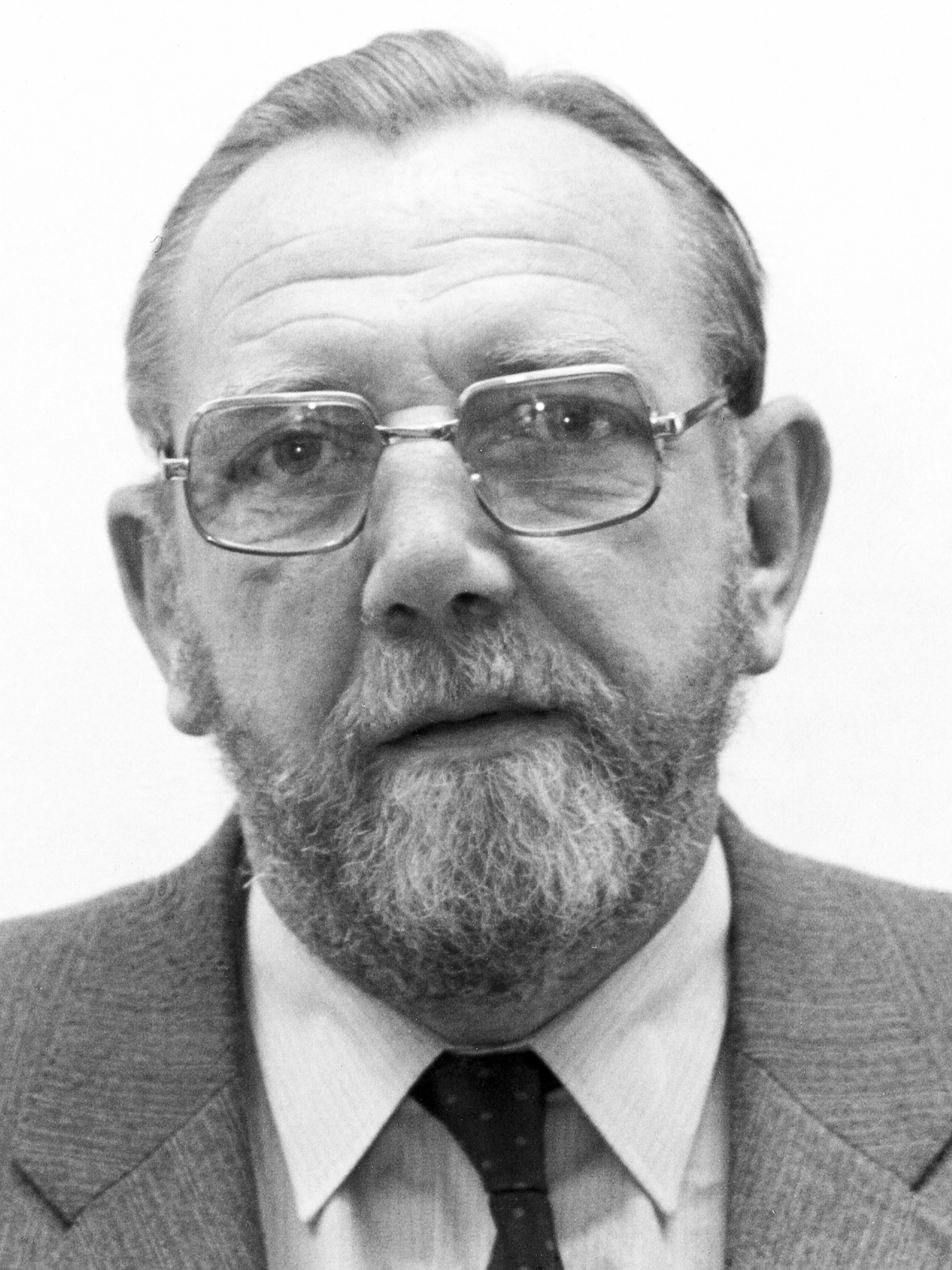
O'Connell clashed with new Labour leader Frank Cluskey in 1981 over constituency changes, ultimately leading to O'Connell leaving the party

O'Connell's Labour Party career ended following constituency boundary changes. Party leader Frank Cluskey moved into Dublin South-Central and expected O'Connell to contest Dublin West, but O'Connell argued that, as a sitting TD, he should choose his constituency, claiming his personal support could secure two seats. After being refused one of three nominations in South-Central, he became an Independent TD.

=== Independent ===
During the 1981 Irish hunger strike, he visited Bobby Sands, reinforcing his republican credentials. At the 1981 Irish general election, O'Connell topped the poll in Dublin South-Central, while Cluskey was defeated, with O'Connell's transfers dividing evenly among parties, indicating a strong personal electoral base.

When the 22nd Dáil met in June 1981, O'Connell was elected as Ceann Comhairle of Dáil Éireann. He resigned from the European Parliament to assume the position. In March 1982, at the beginning of the 23rd Dáil, he was again elected Ceann Comhairle. However, in December 1982, with the meeting of the 24th Dáil, his nomination to the position was unsuccessful, being defeated by Fine Gael TD Tom Fitzpatrick. As outgoing Ceann Comhairle, O'Connell was returned automatically in the two elections of 1982.

During this period, he engaged in negotiations with Charles Haughey regarding potential support for a Fianna Fáil minority government, reportedly attempting to secure the health ministry. He was ultimately elected Ceann Comhairle by the incoming Fine Gael–Labour coalition following discussions with Labour. His approach, described as erratic, caused both amusement and frustration across parties. After the February 1982 Irish general election, he was re-elected Ceann Comhairle, contrary to the expectations of Fine Gael and Labour, who had hoped his resignation would reduce Fianna Fáil's parliamentary voting strength. Fine Gael and Labour subsequently criticised him for perceived pro-Fianna Fáil bias, citing his casting votes in favour of the 1982 government's finance bill and his procedural decisions, while O'Connell maintained that his votes followed the convention of supporting the government. Both Fianna Fáil and Independent TDs acknowledged his accessibility to deputies, his willingness to advise on parliamentary procedure, and his generally lenient interpretation of the rules.

Following the November 1982 general election, which returned a Fine Gael–Labour coalition, O'Connell attempted to remain as Ceann Comhairle but was unsuccessful, stating that Labour remained "his first love". He was largely absent from the Dáil for eighteen months, prompting the Workers' Party to call on him to resign in July 1984.

=== Fianna Fáil ===
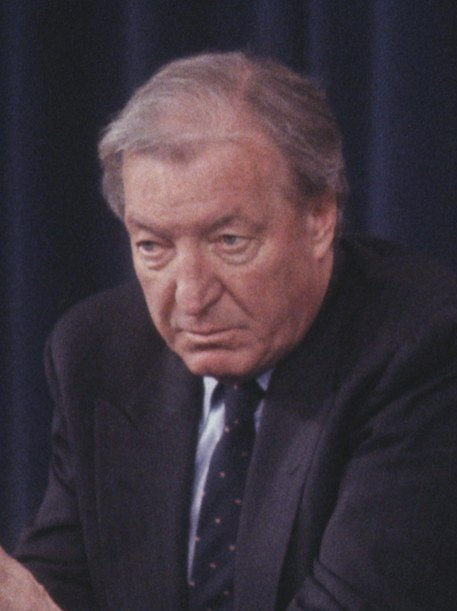
O'Connell became entangled with Charles Haughey in the final years of his career

Between 1980 and 1982 O'Connell sponsored applications for Irish citizenship on behalf of several relatives of the Saudi-based businessman Mahmoud Fustuq, and he later assisted with another naturalisation in 1990. In February 1985, shortly after joining Fianna Fáil, he acted as an intermediary between Fustuq and Charles Haughey. In return for the provision of 15 Irish passports under the "passports for investment" scheme, Haughey received IR£50,000 channelled through O'Connell's bank account. Haughey later claimed this represented the sale of a horse from his Abbeville Stud, an explanation rejected by the Moriarty Tribunal. In March 1985, at Haughey's request, O'Connell also subscribed £5,000 to Celtic Helicopters, a company associated with Haughey's son.

At the 1987 general election O'Connell lost his Dáil seat, and was subsequently nominated to the 18th Seanad by Taoiseach Charles Haughey, serving until he regained his seat at the 1989 general election. During his time in the Seanad, he addressed public meetings on shortcomings in the health service and the need for tax reform, but also attracted criticism. He was ridiculed for claiming that hospital patients on trolleys did not reflect a shortage of beds, since trolleys were "beds with wheels", and irritated colleagues by lamenting that he had been banished to the political margins. In 1988 he published his memoir, Doctor John: Crusading doctor and politician, which combined a moving account of his early life with anecdotal score-settling. Critics described it as disorganised.

By late 1991 and early 1992, O'Connell aligned with Albert Reynolds and is reported to have been among those who pressed Haughey to agree to retire; Haughey subsequently resigned. On Haughey's last day in office, he agreed to buy back O'Connell's shareholding in Celtic Helicopters for £15,000.

On 13 February 1992, O'Connell was appointed Minister for Health by Taoiseach Albert Reynolds. His tenure included measures on family planning and patient information, as well as controversy over the allocation of discretionary grants and several public gaffes; a Dáil Public Accounts Committee inquiry in 1993 examined grants of lottery money awarded to community groups shortly before the November 1992 general election, and O'Connell accepted responsibility for breaches of standard procedures.

Following ill-health, O'Connell retired from cabinet and resigned his Dáil seat on 24 February 1993.

O'Connell gave evidence to the Moriarty Tribunal in 1999 and again in 2006 regarding the Fustuq payments and related matters. The tribunal found in 2006 that a £50,000 payment from Fustuq had been channelled through O'Connell's bank account to Haughey and that the payment was made "in a secretive and clandestine manner" and "did not relate" to a commercial transaction over a horse but was connected to securing Irish passports for Fustuq's relatives; the tribunal concluded that Haughey and O'Connell had acted inappropriately.

Political offices
Preceded by Pádraig Faulkner	Ceann Comhairle of Dáil Éireann; 1981–1982	Succeeded by Thomas Fitzpatrick
Preceded by Mary O'Rourke	Minister for Health; 1992–1993	Succeeded by Brendan Howlin

Dáil	Election	Deputy (Party)	Deputy (Party)	Deputy (Party)	Deputy (Party)	Deputy (Party)
13th	1948	Seán MacBride (CnaP)	Peadar Doyle (FG)	Bernard Butler (FF)	Michael O'Higgins (FG)	Robert Briscoe (FF)
14th	1951	Seán MacBride (CnaP)	Peadar Doyle (FG)	Bernard Butler (FF)	Michael ffrench-O'Carroll (Ind.)	Robert Briscoe (FF)
15th	1954	Seán MacBride (CnaP)	Peadar Doyle (FG)	Bernard Butler (FF)	Michael O'Higgins (FG)	Robert Briscoe (FF)
15th	1956 by-election	Seán MacBride (CnaP)	Noel Lemass (FF)	Bernard Butler (FF)	Michael O'Higgins (FG)	Robert Briscoe (FF)
16th	1957	James Carroll (Ind.)	Noel Lemass (FF)	Bernard Butler (FF)	Michael O'Higgins (FG)	Robert Briscoe (FF)
16th	1959 by-election	James Carroll (Ind.)	Noel Lemass (FF)	Richie Ryan (FG)	Michael O'Higgins (FG)	Robert Briscoe (FF)
17th	1961	James Carroll (Ind.)	Noel Lemass (FF)	Richie Ryan (FG)	James O'Keeffe (FG)	Robert Briscoe (FF)
18th	1965	John O'Connell (Lab)	Noel Lemass (FF)	Richie Ryan (FG)	Joseph Dowling (FF)	Ben Briscoe (FF)
19th	1969	John O'Connell (Lab)	Noel Lemass (FF)	Seán Dunne (Lab)	Joseph Dowling (FF)	4 seats 1969–1977
19th	1970 by-election	John O'Connell (Lab)	Noel Lemass (FF)	Seán Sherwin (FF)	Joseph Dowling (FF)	4 seats 1969–1977
20th	1973	John O'Connell (Lab)	Noel Lemass (FF)	Declan Costello (FG)	Joseph Dowling (FF)	4 seats 1969–1977
20th	1976 by-election	John O'Connell (Lab)	Brendan Halligan (Lab)	Declan Costello (FG)	Joseph Dowling (FF)	4 seats 1969–1977
21st	1977	Constituency abolished. See Dublin Ballyfermot				

Dáil	Election	Deputy (Party)	Deputy (Party)	Deputy (Party)	Deputy (Party)	Deputy (Party)
22nd	1981	Seán Walsh (FF)	Larry McMahon (FG)	Mary Harney (FF)	Mervyn Taylor (Lab)	4 seats 1981–1992
23rd	1982 (Feb)	Seán Walsh (FF)	Larry McMahon (FG)	Mary Harney (FF)	Mervyn Taylor (Lab)	4 seats 1981–1992
24th	1982 (Nov)	Seán Walsh (FF)	Michael O'Leary (FG)	Mary Harney (FF)	Mervyn Taylor (Lab)	4 seats 1981–1992
25th	1987	Seán Walsh (FF)	Chris Flood (FF)	Mary Harney (PDs)	Mervyn Taylor (Lab)	4 seats 1981–1992
26th	1989	Pat Rabbitte (WP)	Chris Flood (FF)	Mary Harney (PDs)	Mervyn Taylor (Lab)	4 seats 1981–1992
27th	1992	Pat Rabbitte (DL)	Chris Flood (FF)	Mary Harney (PDs)	Mervyn Taylor (Lab)	Éamonn Walsh (Lab)
28th	1997	Pat Rabbitte (DL)	Chris Flood (FF)	Mary Harney (PDs)	Conor Lenihan (FF)	Brian Hayes (FG)
29th	2002	Pat Rabbitte (Lab)	Charlie O'Connor (FF)	Seán Crowe (SF)	Conor Lenihan (FF)	4 seats 2002–2016
30th	2007	Pat Rabbitte (Lab)	Charlie O'Connor (FF)	Brian Hayes (FG)	Conor Lenihan (FF)	4 seats 2002–2016
31st	2011	Pat Rabbitte (Lab)	Eamonn Maloney (Lab)	Brian Hayes (FG)	Seán Crowe (SF)	4 seats 2002–2016
31st	2014 by-election	Pat Rabbitte (Lab)	Eamonn Maloney (Lab)	Paul Murphy (AAA)	Seán Crowe (SF)	4 seats 2002–2016
32nd	2016	Colm Brophy (FG)	John Lahart (FF)	Paul Murphy (AAA–PBP)	Seán Crowe (SF)	Katherine Zappone (Ind.)
33rd	2020	Colm Brophy (FG)	John Lahart (FF)	Paul Murphy (S–PBP)	Seán Crowe (SF)	Francis Noel Duffy (GP)
34th	2024	Colm Brophy (FG)	John Lahart (FF)	Paul Murphy (PBP–S)	Seán Crowe (SF)	Ciarán Ahern (Lab)

Dáil	Election	Deputy (Party)	Deputy (Party)	Deputy (Party)
21st	1977	John O'Connell (Lab)	Eileen Lemass (FF)	Jim Mitchell (FG)
22nd	1981	Constituency abolished		

Dáil	Election	Deputy (Party)	Deputy (Party)	Deputy (Party)	Deputy (Party)	Deputy (Party)
13th	1948	Seán Lemass (FF)	James Larkin Jnr (Lab)	Con Lehane (CnaP)	Maurice E. Dockrell (FG)	John McCann (FF)
14th	1951	Seán Lemass (FF)	James Larkin Jnr (Lab)	Philip Brady (FF)	Maurice E. Dockrell (FG)	John McCann (FF)
15th	1954	Seán Lemass (FF)	James Larkin Jnr (Lab)	Thomas Finlay (FG)	Maurice E. Dockrell (FG)	Celia Lynch (FF)
16th	1957	Seán Lemass (FF)	Jack Murphy (Ind.)	Philip Brady (FF)	Maurice E. Dockrell (FG)	Celia Lynch (FF)
16th	1958 by-election	Seán Lemass (FF)	Patrick Cummins (FF)	Philip Brady (FF)	Maurice E. Dockrell (FG)	Celia Lynch (FF)
17th	1961	Seán Lemass (FF)	Patrick Cummins (FF)	Philip Brady (FF)	Maurice E. Dockrell (FG)	Joseph Barron (CnaP)
18th	1965	Seán Lemass (FF)	Frank Cluskey (Lab)	Philip Brady (FF)	Maurice E. Dockrell (FG)	Thomas J. Fitzpatrick (FF)
19th	1969	Richie Ryan (FG)	Ben Briscoe (FF)	Philip Brady (FF)	John O'Donovan (Lab)	4 seats 1969–1977
20th	1973	Richie Ryan (FG)	Ben Briscoe (FF)	Philip Brady (FF)	John Kelly (FG)	4 seats 1969–1977
21st	1977	Fergus O'Brien (FG)	Frank Cluskey (Lab)	Thomas J. Fitzpatrick (FF)	3 seats 1977–1981	
22nd	1981	Fergus O'Brien (FG)	Ben Briscoe (FF)	Thomas J. Fitzpatrick (FF)	Gay Mitchell (FG)	John O'Connell (Note: O'Connell served as Ceann Comhairle in the 22nd and 23rd Dáil from 1981 to 1983 and was returned automatically at the February 1982 and November 1982 general elections. He joined Fianna Fáil in January 1985.) (Ind.)
23rd	1982 (Feb)	Frank Cluskey (Lab)	Ben Briscoe (FF)	Thomas J. Fitzpatrick (FF)	Gay Mitchell (FG)	John O'Connell (Ind.)
24th	1982 (Nov)	Frank Cluskey (Lab)	Ben Briscoe (FF)	Fergus O'Brien (FG)	Gay Mitchell (FG)	John O'Connell (Ind.)
25th	1987	Frank Cluskey (Lab)	Ben Briscoe (FF)	Fergus O'Brien (FG)	Gay Mitchell (FG)	Mary Mooney (FF)
26th	1989	John O'Connell (FF)	Ben Briscoe (FF)	Fergus O'Brien (FG)	Gay Mitchell (FG)	Eric Byrne (WP)
27th	1992	John O'Connell (FF)	Ben Briscoe (FF)	Pat Upton (Lab)	Gay Mitchell (FG)	4 seats 1992–2002
27th	1994 by-election	Eric Byrne (DL)	Ben Briscoe (FF)	Pat Upton (Lab)	Gay Mitchell (FG)	4 seats 1992–2002
28th	1997	Seán Ardagh (FF)	Ben Briscoe (FF)	Pat Upton (Lab)	Gay Mitchell (FG)	4 seats 1992–2002
28th	1999 by-election	Seán Ardagh (FF)	Ben Briscoe (FF)	Mary Upton (Lab)	Gay Mitchell (FG)	4 seats 1992–2002
29th	2002	Seán Ardagh (FF)	Aengus Ó Snodaigh (SF)	Mary Upton (Lab)	Gay Mitchell (FG)	Michael Mulcahy (FF)
30th	2007	Seán Ardagh (FF)	Aengus Ó Snodaigh (SF)	Mary Upton (Lab)	Catherine Byrne (FG)	Michael Mulcahy (FF)
31st	2011	Eric Byrne (Lab)	Aengus Ó Snodaigh (SF)	Joan Collins (PBP)	Catherine Byrne (FG)	Michael Conaghan (Lab)
32nd	2016	Bríd Smith (AAA–PBP)	Aengus Ó Snodaigh (SF)	Joan Collins (Note: Founded Right to Change in May 2020.) (I4C)	Catherine Byrne (FG)	4 seats from 2016
33rd	2020	Bríd Smith (S–PBP)	Aengus Ó Snodaigh (SF)	Joan Collins (I4C)	Patrick Costello (GP)	4 seats from 2016
34th	2024	Catherine Ardagh (FF)	Aengus Ó Snodaigh (SF)	Máire Devine (SF)	Jen Cummins (SD)	4 seats from 2016
