= John O'Hanlon (politician) =

Irish politician (1872–1956)

Teachta Dála
- In office June 1927 – January 1933
- Constituency: Cavan

Personal details
- Born: 4 November 1872 County Cavan, Ireland
- Died: 22 December 1956 (aged 84) County Cavan, Ireland
- Party: Independent
- Other political affiliations: Farmers' Party; National Centre Party

John Frederick O'Hanlon (4 November 1872 – 22 December 1956) was an Irish politician and journalist. He stood unsuccessfully as a Farmers' Party candidate at the Cavan by-election on 11 March 1925. He was first elected to Dáil Éireann as an independent Teachta Dála (TD) for the Cavan constituency at the June 1927 general election. He was re-elected at the September 1927 and 1932 general elections. He contested the 1933 general election as a National Centre Party candidate but did not retain his seat.

| Dáil | Election | Deputy (Party) | Deputy (Party) | Deputy (Party) | Deputy (Party) |
|---|---|---|---|---|---|
| 2nd | 1921 | Arthur Griffith (SF) | Paul Galligan (SF) | Seán Milroy (SF) | 3 seats 1921–1923 |
| 3rd | 1922 | Arthur Griffith (PT-SF) | Walter L. Cole (PT-SF) | Seán Milroy (PT-SF) | 3 seats 1921–1923 |
| 4th | 1923 | Patrick Smith (Rep) | John James Cole (Ind.) | Seán Milroy (CnaG) | Patrick Baxter (FP) |
| 4th | 1925 by-election | Patrick Smith (Rep) | John James Cole (Ind.) | John Joe O'Reilly (CnaG) | Patrick Baxter (FP) |
| 5th | 1927 (Jun) | Paddy Smith (FF) | John O'Hanlon (Ind.) | John Joe O'Reilly (CnaG) | Patrick Baxter (FP) |
| 6th | 1927 (Sep) | Paddy Smith (FF) | John O'Hanlon (Ind.) | John Joe O'Reilly (CnaG) | John James Cole (Ind.) |
| 7th | 1932 | Paddy Smith (FF) | John O'Hanlon (Ind.) | John Joe O'Reilly (CnaG) | Michael Sheridan (FF) |
| 8th | 1933 | Paddy Smith (FF) | Patrick McGovern (NCP) | John Joe O'Reilly (CnaG) | Michael Sheridan (FF) |
| 9th | 1937 | Paddy Smith (FF) | Patrick McGovern (FG) | John James Cole (Ind.) | Michael Sheridan (FF) |
| 10th | 1938 | Paddy Smith (FF) | Patrick McGovern (FG) | John James Cole (Ind.) | Michael Sheridan (FF) |
| 11th | 1943 | Paddy Smith (FF) | Patrick O'Reilly (CnaT) | John James Cole (Ind.) | Michael Sheridan (FF) |
| 12th | 1944 | Paddy Smith (FF) | Patrick O'Reilly (CnaT) | Tom O'Reilly (Ind.) | Michael Sheridan (FF) |
| 13th | 1948 | Paddy Smith (FF) | John Tully (CnaP) | Patrick O'Reilly (Ind.) | Michael Sheridan (FF) |
| 14th | 1951 | Paddy Smith (FF) | John Tully (CnaP) | Patrick O'Reilly (FG) | Michael Sheridan (FF) |
| 15th | 1954 | Paddy Smith (FF) | John Tully (CnaP) | Patrick O'Reilly (FG) | Michael Sheridan (FF) |
| 16th | 1957 | Paddy Smith (FF) | John Tully (CnaP) | Patrick O'Reilly (FG) | Michael Sheridan (FF) |
| 17th | 1961 | Paddy Smith (FF) | Séamus Dolan (FF) | Patrick O'Reilly (FG) | 3 seats 1961–1977 |
| 18th | 1965 | Paddy Smith (FF) | John Tully (CnaP) | Tom Fitzpatrick (FG) | 3 seats 1961–1977 |
| 19th | 1969 | Paddy Smith (FF) | Patrick O'Reilly (FG) | Tom Fitzpatrick (FG) | 3 seats 1961–1977 |
| 20th | 1973 | Paddy Smith (FF) | John Wilson (FF) | Tom Fitzpatrick (FG) | 3 seats 1961–1977 |
| 21st | 1977 | Constituency abolished. See Cavan–Monaghan | | | |
