= Thomas J. Fitzpatrick (Cavan politician) =

Irish politician (1918–2006)

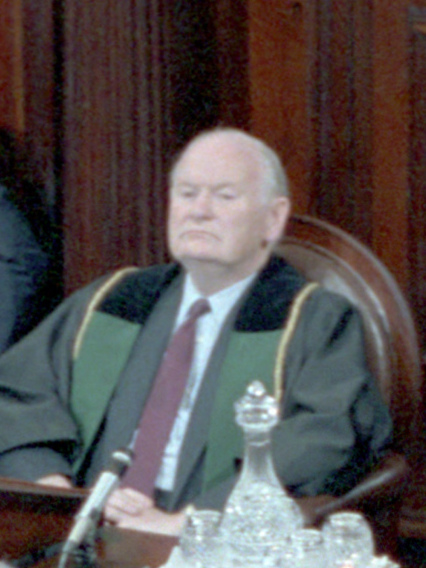
- Fitzpatrick in 1984

Ceann Comhairle of Dáil Éireann
- In office 14 December 1982 – 10 March 1987
- Deputy: John Ryan
- Preceded by: John O'Connell
- Succeeded by: Seán Treacy

Minister for Fisheries and Forestry
- In office 30 June 1981 – 9 March 1982
- Taoiseach: Garret FitzGerald
- Preceded by: Paddy Power
- Succeeded by: Brendan Daly

Minister for Transport and Power
- In office 2 December 1976 – 5 July 1977
- Taoiseach: Liam Cosgrave
- Preceded by: Peter Barry
- Succeeded by: Pádraig Faulkner

Minister for Lands
- In office 14 March 1973 – 2 December 1976
- Taoiseach: Liam Cosgrave
- Preceded by: Seán Flanagan
- Succeeded by: Paddy Donegan

Teachta Dála
- In office June 1977 – June 1989
- Constituency: Cavan–Monaghan
- In office April 1965 – June 1977
- Constituency: Cavan

Senator
- In office 14 December 1961 – 7 April 1965
- Constituency: Labour Panel

Personal details
- Born: 14 February 1918 Clones, County Monaghan, Ireland
- Died: 2 October 2006 (aged 88) Cavan, Ireland
- Party: Fine Gael
- Spouses: Elizabeth Cullen (m. 1946; died 1951); Carmel McDonald (m. 1973)
- Children: 3
- Education: University College Dublin

Thomas James Fitzpatrick (14 February 1918 – 2 October 2006) was an Irish Fine Gael politician who served as Ceann Comhairle of Dáil Éireann from 1982 to 1987, Minister for Fisheries and Forestry from 1981 to 1982, Minister for Transport and Power from 1976 to 1977 and Minister for Lands from 1973 to 1976. He served as a TD from 1965 to 1989. He was a Senator for the Labour Panel from 1961 to 1965.

== Early life ==
Fitzpatrick was born and raised in the village of Scotshouse, near Clones, in the west of County Monaghan, being born in February 1918. He was educated at St. Macartan's College, the Incorporated Law Society and University College, Dublin (UCD), where he qualified as a solicitor; he then entered practice as a solicitor in Cavan town.

== Politics ==
Fitzpatrick first held political office in 1950, when he was elected to Cavan Urban District Council. In 1961, he moved to national politics when he was elected to Seanad Éireann. He was elected to Dáil Éireann as a Fine Gael TD for the Cavan constituency at the 1965 general election. He held many Opposition Front Bench portfolios including Defence, Health and Social Welfare, Justice and the Environment, as well as being Fine Gael Chief Whip from 1979 to 1981.

Fitzpatrick served in the Irish Government on several occasions under Liam Cosgrave and Garret FitzGerald. His first government post was in 1973, when he was appointed Minister for Lands. After Fine Gael lost power in 1977, he was mentioned as a possible leader of the party if a compromise were needed between FitzGerald and Cosgrave. Following the November 1982 general election, he was elected as Ceann Comhairle, a post which he held until 1987. Fitzpatrick was re-elected to the Dáil (or automatically returned as Ceann Comhairle) at every election until 1989 when he retired from politics.

Political offices
Preceded by Seán Flanagan	Minister for Lands; 1973–1976	Succeeded by Paddy Donegan
Preceded by Peter Barry	Minister for Transport and Power; 1976–977	Succeeded by Pádraig Faulkner
Preceded by Paddy Power	Minister for Fisheries and Forestry; 1981–1982	Succeeded by Brendan Daly
Preceded by John O'Connell	Ceann Comhairle of Dáil Éireann; 1982–1987	Succeeded by Seán Treacy

Dáil	Election	Deputy (Party)	Deputy (Party)	Deputy (Party)	Deputy (Party)
2nd	1921	Arthur Griffith (SF)	Paul Galligan (SF)	Seán Milroy (SF)	3 seats 1921–1923
3rd	1922	Arthur Griffith (PT-SF)	Walter L. Cole (PT-SF)	Seán Milroy (PT-SF)	3 seats 1921–1923
4th	1923	Patrick Smith (Rep)	John James Cole (Ind.)	Seán Milroy (CnaG)	Patrick Baxter (FP)
4th	1925 by-election	Patrick Smith (Rep)	John James Cole (Ind.)	John Joe O'Reilly (CnaG)	Patrick Baxter (FP)
5th	1927 (Jun)	Patrick Smith (FF)	John O'Hanlon (Ind.)	John Joe O'Reilly (CnaG)	Patrick Baxter (FP)
6th	1927 (Sep)	Patrick Smith (FF)	John O'Hanlon (Ind.)	John Joe O'Reilly (CnaG)	John James Cole (Ind.)
7th	1932	Patrick Smith (FF)	John O'Hanlon (Ind.)	John Joe O'Reilly (CnaG)	Michael Sheridan (FF)
8th	1933	Patrick Smith (FF)	Patrick McGovern (NCP)	John Joe O'Reilly (CnaG)	Michael Sheridan (FF)
9th	1937	Patrick Smith (FF)	Patrick McGovern (FG)	John James Cole (Ind.)	Michael Sheridan (FF)
10th	1938	Patrick Smith (FF)	Patrick McGovern (FG)	John James Cole (Ind.)	Michael Sheridan (FF)
11th	1943	Patrick Smith (FF)	Patrick O'Reilly (CnaT)	John James Cole (Ind.)	Michael Sheridan (FF)
12th	1944	Patrick Smith (FF)	Patrick O'Reilly (CnaT)	Tom O'Reilly (Ind.)	Michael Sheridan (FF)
13th	1948	Patrick Smith (FF)	John Tully (CnaP)	Patrick O'Reilly (Ind.)	Michael Sheridan (FF)
14th	1951	Patrick Smith (FF)	John Tully (CnaP)	Patrick O'Reilly (FG)	Michael Sheridan (FF)
15th	1954	Patrick Smith (FF)	John Tully (CnaP)	Patrick O'Reilly (FG)	Michael Sheridan (FF)
16th	1957	Patrick Smith (FF)	John Tully (CnaP)	Patrick O'Reilly (FG)	Michael Sheridan (FF)
17th	1961	Patrick Smith (FF)	Séamus Dolan (FF)	Patrick O'Reilly (FG)	3 seats 1961–1977
18th	1965	Patrick Smith (FF)	John Tully (CnaP)	Tom Fitzpatrick (FG)	3 seats 1961–1977
19th	1969	Patrick Smith (FF)	Patrick O'Reilly (FG)	Tom Fitzpatrick (FG)	3 seats 1961–1977
20th	1973	Patrick Smith (FF)	John Wilson (FF)	Tom Fitzpatrick (FG)	3 seats 1961–1977
21st	1977	Constituency abolished. See Cavan–Monaghan			

Dáil	Election	Deputy (Party)	Deputy (Party)	Deputy (Party)	Deputy (Party)	Deputy (Party)
21st	1977	Jimmy Leonard (FF)	John Wilson (FF)	Thomas J. Fitzpatrick (FG)	Rory O'Hanlon (FF)	John Conlan (FG)
22nd	1981	Kieran Doherty (AHB)	John Wilson (FF)	Thomas J. Fitzpatrick (FG)	Rory O'Hanlon (FF)	John Conlan (FG)
23rd	1982 (Feb)	Jimmy Leonard (FF)	John Wilson (FF)	Thomas J. Fitzpatrick (FG)	Rory O'Hanlon (FF)	John Conlan (FG)
24th	1982 (Nov)	Jimmy Leonard (FF)	John Wilson (FF)	Thomas J. Fitzpatrick (FG)	Rory O'Hanlon (FF)	John Conlan (FG)
25th	1987	Jimmy Leonard (FF)	John Wilson (FF)	Thomas J. Fitzpatrick (FG)	Rory O'Hanlon (FF)	Andrew Boylan (FG)
26th	1989	Jimmy Leonard (FF)	John Wilson (FF)	Bill Cotter (FG)	Rory O'Hanlon (FF)	Andrew Boylan (FG)
27th	1992	Jimmy Leonard (FF)	Brendan Smith (FF)	Seymour Crawford (FG)	Rory O'Hanlon (FF)	Andrew Boylan (FG)
28th	1997	Caoimhghín Ó Caoláin (SF)	Brendan Smith (FF)	Seymour Crawford (FG)	Rory O'Hanlon (FF)	Andrew Boylan (FG)
29th	2002	Caoimhghín Ó Caoláin (SF)	Brendan Smith (FF)	Seymour Crawford (FG)	Rory O'Hanlon (FF)	Paudge Connolly (Ind.)
30th	2007	Caoimhghín Ó Caoláin (SF)	Brendan Smith (FF)	Seymour Crawford (FG)	Rory O'Hanlon (FF)	Margaret Conlon (FF)
31st	2011	Caoimhghín Ó Caoláin (SF)	Brendan Smith (FF)	Heather Humphreys (FG)	Joe O'Reilly (FG)	Seán Conlan (FG)
32nd	2016	Caoimhghín Ó Caoláin (SF)	Brendan Smith (FF)	Heather Humphreys (FG)	Niamh Smyth (FF)	4 seats 2016–2020
33rd	2020	Matt Carthy (SF)	Brendan Smith (FF)	Heather Humphreys (FG)	Niamh Smyth (FF)	Pauline Tully (SF)
34th	2024	Matt Carthy (SF)	Brendan Smith (FF)	David Maxwell (FG)	Niamh Smyth (FF)	Cathy Bennett (SF)
