= Cavan (Dáil constituency) =

Dáil constituency (1921–1977)

- Former Dáil constituency

Former constituency
- Created: 1921
- Abolished: 1977
- Seats: 3 (1921–1923); 4 (1923–1961); 3 (1961–1977)
- Local government area: County Cavan
- Created from: East Cavan; West Cavan
- Replaced by: Cavan–Monaghan

Cavan is a former parliamentary constituency represented in Dáil Éireann, the house of representatives of the Oireachtas, from 1921 to 1977. The method of election was proportional representation by means of the single transferable vote (PR-STV).

== History and boundaries ==
The constituency was created in 1921 under the Government of Ireland Act 1920 as a 3-seat constituency for the Southern Ireland House of Commons and a single-seat constituency for the United Kingdom House of Commons at Westminster, combining the former Westminster constituencies of East Cavan and West Cavan. At the 1921 election for the Southern Ireland House of Commons, the three seats were won uncontested by Sinn Féin, who treated it as part of the election to the Second Dáil. It was never used as a Westminster constituency; under the Irish Free State (Agreement) Act 1922, no writ was to be issued "for a constituency in Ireland other than a constituency in Northern Ireland". Therefore, no vote was held in Cavan at the 1922 United Kingdom general election on 15 November 1922, shortly before the Irish Free State left the United Kingdom on 6 December 1922.

The constituency was recreated under the Electoral Act 1923, the first electoral act of the new state. At the 1977 general election, the Cavan and Monaghan constituencies were abolished and succeeded by the new 5-seat Cavan–Monaghan constituency.

Changes to the Cavan constituency
Years	TDs	Boundaries	Notes
1921–1923	3	County Cavan	Constituency created from East Cavan and West Cavan
1923–1961	4	County Cavan	
1961–1969	3	County Cavan	
1969–1977	3	County Cavan and: in County Meath the district electoral divisions of Moybolgue, Moynalty, Newcastle, Newtown, Trohanny, in the former Rural District of Kells; Crossakeel, Crosskeys, Killallon, Killeagh, Knocklough, Moylagh, Oldcastle, Stonefield, in the former Rural District of Oldcastle.	Transfer from Meath
1977	—	Constituency abolished	County Cavan became part of Cavan–Monaghan, with the part in County Meath transferred to Meath

== TDs ==
Teachtaí Dála (TDs) for Cavan 1921–1977
Key to parties: CnaP = Clann na Poblachta; CnaT = Clann na Talmhan; CnaG = Cumann na nGaedheal; FP = Farmers' Party; FF = Fianna Fáil; FG = Fine Gael; Ind. = Independent; NCP = National Centre Party; Rep = Republican; SF = Sinn Féin; PT-SF = Sinn Féin (Pro-Treaty)
Dáil	Election	Deputy (Party)	Deputy (Party)	Deputy (Party)	Deputy (Party)
2nd	1921	Arthur Griffith (SF)	Peter Paul Galligan (SF)	Seán Milroy (SF)	3 seats 1921–1923
3rd	1922	Arthur Griffith (PT-SF)	Walter L. Cole (PT-SF)	Seán Milroy (PT-SF)	3 seats 1921–1923
4th	1923	Patrick Smith (Rep)	John James Cole (Ind.)	Seán Milroy (CnaG)	Patrick Baxter (FP)
4th	1925 by-election	Patrick Smith (Rep)	John James Cole (Ind.)	John Joe O'Reilly (CnaG)	Patrick Baxter (FP)
5th	1927 (Jun)	Patrick Smith (FF)	John O'Hanlon (Ind.)	John Joe O'Reilly (CnaG)	Patrick Baxter (FP)
6th	1927 (Sep)	Patrick Smith (FF)	John O'Hanlon (Ind.)	John Joe O'Reilly (CnaG)	John James Cole (Ind.)
7th	1932	Patrick Smith (FF)	John O'Hanlon (Ind.)	John Joe O'Reilly (CnaG)	Michael Sheridan (FF)
8th	1933	Patrick Smith (FF)	Patrick McGovern (NCP)	John Joe O'Reilly (CnaG)	Michael Sheridan (FF)
9th	1937	Patrick Smith (FF)	Patrick McGovern (FG)	John James Cole (Ind.)	Michael Sheridan (FF)
10th	1938	Patrick Smith (FF)	Patrick McGovern (FG)	John James Cole (Ind.)	Michael Sheridan (FF)
11th	1943	Patrick Smith (FF)	Patrick O'Reilly (CnaT)	John James Cole (Ind.)	Michael Sheridan (FF)
12th	1944	Patrick Smith (FF)	Patrick O'Reilly (CnaT)	Tom O'Reilly (Ind.)	Michael Sheridan (FF)
13th	1948	Patrick Smith (FF)	John Tully (CnaP)	Patrick O'Reilly (Ind.)	Michael Sheridan (FF)
14th	1951	Patrick Smith (FF)	John Tully (CnaP)	Patrick O'Reilly (FG)	Michael Sheridan (FF)
15th	1954	Patrick Smith (FF)	John Tully (CnaP)	Patrick O'Reilly (FG)	Michael Sheridan (FF)
16th	1957	Patrick Smith (FF)	John Tully (CnaP)	Patrick O'Reilly (FG)	Michael Sheridan (FF)
17th	1961	Patrick Smith (FF)	Séamus Dolan (FF)	Patrick O'Reilly (FG)	3 seats 1961–1977
18th	1965	Patrick Smith (FF)	John Tully (CnaP)	Tom Fitzpatrick (FG)	3 seats 1961–1977
19th	1969	Patrick Smith (FF)	Patrick O'Reilly (FG)	Tom Fitzpatrick (FG)	3 seats 1961–1977
20th	1973	Patrick Smith (FF)	John Wilson (FF)	Tom Fitzpatrick (FG)	3 seats 1961–1977
21st	1977	Constituency abolished. See Cavan–Monaghan			

Note: The columns in this table are used only for presentational purposes, and no significance should be attached to the order of columns. For details of the order in which seats were won at each election, see the detailed results of that election.

== Elections ==
*: Outgoing TD

=== 1973 general election ===
1973 general election: Cavan
Party	Candidate	FPv%	Count				
Party	Candidate	FPv%	1	2	3	4	5
Fine Gael	Thomas J. Fitzpatrick	28.1	7,276				
Fianna Fáil	Patrick Smith	23.1	5,979	6,292	6,685	8,657	
Fianna Fáil	John Wilson	14.9	3,846	4,073	4,173	5,233	6,672
Fine Gael	Patrick O'Reilly	13.4	3,459	4,114	6,047	6,323	6,369
Fianna Fáil	Séamus Dolan	12.5	3,231	3,428	3,770		
Fine Gael	David Coleman	9.8	2,828	3,162			
Aontacht Éireann	James Kelly	8.0	2,068				
Electorate: 37,299 Valid: 28,687 Quota: 7,172 Turnout: 76.9%

=== 1969 general election ===
1969 general election: Cavan
Party	Candidate	FPv%	Count					
Party	Candidate	FPv%	1	2	3	4	5	6
Fine Gael	Thomas J. Fitzpatrick	23.8	7,092	7,329	8,631			
Fianna Fáil	Patrick Smith	21.4	6,380	6,549	6,625	6,671	7,495	
Fianna Fáil	Séamus Dolan	11.9	3,563	3,734	3,778	3,791	4,986	5,902
Fine Gael	Patrick O'Reilly	11.9	3,548	3,842	4,188	5,193	5,335	6,910
Independent	John Tully	10.4	3,123	3,581	3,647	3,702	3,950	
Fianna Fáil	Richard Black	7.4	2,212	2,329	2,683	2,729		
Fine Gael	Thomas Anderson	7.3	2,194	2,266				
Labour	James Caffrey	4.2	1,255					
Labour	Thomas O'Connor	1.7	495					
Electorate: 37,331 Valid: 29,862 Quota: 7,466 Turnout: 80.0%

=== 1965 general election ===
1965 general election: Cavan
Party	Candidate	FPv%	Count				
Party	Candidate	FPv%	1	2	3	4	5
Fianna Fáil	Patrick Smith	24.7	6,758	6,875			
Fine Gael	Thomas J. Fitzpatrick	19.7	5,408	5,528	9,363		
Fianna Fáil	Séamus Dolan	18.8	5,145	5,237	5,382	5,393	5,641
Fine Gael	Patrick O'Reilly	16.9	4,643	4,735			
Clann na Poblachta	John Tully	16.3	4,476	5,006	5,550	5,561	7,823
Labour	John O'Rourke	3.6	981				
Electorate: 34,709 Valid: 27,411 Quota: 6,853 Turnout: 79.0%

=== 1961 general election ===
1961 general election: Cavan
Party	Candidate	FPv%	Count			
Party	Candidate	FPv%	1	2	3	4
Fianna Fáil	Patrick Smith	32.5	9,032			
Fine Gael	Patrick O'Reilly	19.5	5,431	5,619	6,969	
Clann na Poblachta	John Tully	16.8	4,683	4,937	5,125	6,482
Fianna Fáil	Séamus Dolan	16.7	4,658	6,166	6,294	6,743
Sinn Féin	Patrick Duffy	7.7	2,153	2,219	2,405	
Fine Gael	John McGovern	6.7	1,862	1,923		
Electorate: 35,933 Valid: 27,819 Quota: 6,955 Turnout: 77.4%

=== 1957 general election ===
1957 general election: Cavan
Party	Candidate	FPv%	Count				
Party	Candidate	FPv%	1	2	3	4	5
Fianna Fáil	Patrick Smith	23.9	7,309				
Fine Gael	Patrick O'Reilly	15.4	4,704	4,751	5,860	5,965	6,416
Clann na Poblachta	John Tully	14.2	4,327	4,414	4,524	4,694	6,397
Independent	John James Cole	13.6	4,161	4,184	4,217	4,267	4,366
Sinn Féin	Pádraig Ó Dubhthaigh	10.8	3,308	3,345	3,494	3,742	
Fianna Fáil	Séamus Dolan	8.6	2,626	2,794	2,853		
Fianna Fáil	Michael Sheridan	8.5	2,610	3,428	3,491	5,703	6,642
Fine Gael	John McGovern	5.0	1,533	1,546			
Electorate: 39,142 Valid: 30,578 Quota: 6,116 Turnout: 78.1%

=== 1954 general election ===
1954 general election: Cavan
Party	Candidate	FPv%	Count					
Party	Candidate	FPv%	1	2	3	4	5	6
Fianna Fáil	Patrick Smith	22.8	7,570					
Clann na Poblachta	John Tully	17.8	5,898	5,965	6,212	6,407	7,657	
Independent	John James Cole	14.2	4,704	4,724	4,748	4,798	5,251	5,591
Fine Gael	Patrick O'Reilly	12.9	4,280	4,310	5,107	5,171	6,408	6,823
Independent	Patrick O'Reilly	10.8	3,597	3,635	3,930	4,154		
Fianna Fáil	Séamus Dolan	8.4	2,773	2,893	2,992			
Fianna Fáil	Michael Sheridan	8.3	2,759	3,410	3,522	5,906	6,860	
Fine Gael	John McGovern	4.8	1,596	1,604				
Electorate: 40,301 Valid: 33,177 Quota: 6,636 Turnout: 82.3%

=== 1951 general election ===
1951 general election: Cavan
Party	Candidate	FPv%	Count				
Party	Candidate	FPv%	1	2	3	4	5
Fianna Fáil	Patrick Smith	23.9	8,172				
Clann na Poblachta	John Tully	18.7	6,413	6,486	6,761	7,791	
Independent	Jack Cole	14.5	4,981	5,002	5,060	5,401	5,641
Fine Gael	Patrick O'Reilly	14.3	4,911	4,953	5,099	6,371	6,747
Fianna Fáil	Michael Sheridan	10.4	3,564	4,493	6,667	7,538	
Independent	Patrick O'Reilly	10.0	3,438	3,486	3,744		
Fianna Fáil	Gerald M. Lovett	6.7	2,287	2,477			
Independent	Eric D. O'Gowan	1.4	495	511			
Electorate: 42,098 Valid: 34,261 Quota: 6,853 Turnout: 81.38%

=== 1948 general election ===
1948 general election: Cavan
Party	Candidate	FPv%	Count						
Party	Candidate	FPv%	1	2	3	4	5	6	7
Fianna Fáil	Patrick Smith	32.2	11,168						
Independent	Patrick O'Reilly	14.8	5,139	5,500	5,557	5,760	6,104	7,347	
Independent	John James Cole	14.4	4,982	5,101	5,185	5,222	5,289	5,464	5,656
Fianna Fáil	Michael Sheridan	9.3	3,221	6,176	6,455	8,010			
Clann na Poblachta	John Tully	8.6	2,970	3,088	3,559	3,679	3,811	4,181	6,670
Clann na Poblachta	Peter A. Donohoe	6.5	2,253	2,370	2,496	2,605	2,679	3,220	
Fine Gael	Tom O'Reilly	6.0	2,081	2,220	2,307	2,401	2,558		
Fianna Fáil	Francis Dolphin	5.2	1,794	2,098	2,179				
Labour	Edward Thornton	3.2	1,119	1,228					
Electorate: 44,068 Valid: 34,727 Quota: 6,946 Turnout: 78.80%

=== 1944 general election ===
1944 general election: Cavan
Party	Candidate	FPv%	Count			
Party	Candidate	FPv%	1	2	3	4
Fianna Fáil	Patrick Smith	31.7	10,609			
Clann na Talmhan	Patrick O'Reilly	17.3	5,794	6,101	6,589	6,750
Independent	John James Cole	16.9	5,634	5,721	5,794	5,821
Independent	Tom O'Reilly	15.0	5,000	5,428	6,134	6,418
Fianna Fáil	Michael Sheridan	12.8	4,286	7,156		
Fianna Fáil	Bernard Fay	6.3	2,095	2,328		
Electorate: 46,501 Valid: 33,418 Quota: 6,684 Turnout: 71.7%

=== 1943 general election ===
1943 general election: Cavan
Party	Candidate	FPv%	Count								
Party	Candidate	FPv%	1	2	3	4	5	6	7	8	9
Fianna Fáil	Patrick Smith	25.9	9,279								
Clann na Talmhan	Patrick O'Reilly	15.0	5,397	5,597	5,641	5,829	6,309	6,651	7,088	7,740	
Independent	John James Cole	14.8	5,307	5,363	5,402	5,656	5,780	5,918	6,165	6,423	7,005
Fianna Fáil	Michael Sheridan	8.4	3,023	4,420	4,475	4,551	4,970	5,879	6,012	6,507	6,988
Independent	James Keogan	5.5	1,968	2,020	2,077	2,116	2,241	2,334	2,412		
Fine Gael	Patrick McGovern	5.5	1,962	1,995	2,056	2,566	2,691	2,874	3,540	3,717	4,160
Independent	Hugh O'Donoghue	4.7	1,671	1,751	1,787	1,832					
Fianna Fáil	James O'Reilly	4.6	1,664	1,762	1,815	1,885	1,992				
Labour	Michael Keating	4.4	1,570	1,603	2,181	2,252	2,436	2,492	2,747	3,025	
Fine Gael	Patrick Farrell	4.3	1,550	1,646	1,667	1,946	2,035	2,135			
Fine Gael	Patrick Baxter	4.2	1,504	1,531	1,579						
Labour	Michael Magee	2.8	988	1,018							
Electorate: 46,501 Valid: 35,883 Quota: 7,177 Turnout: 77.2%

=== 1938 general election ===
1938 general election: Cavan
Party	Candidate	FPv%	Count			
Party	Candidate	FPv%	1	2	3	4
Fianna Fáil	Patrick Smith	25.5	9,129			
Fianna Fáil	Michael Sheridan	22.5	8,049			
Independent	John James Cole	17.8	6,375	6,771	6,949	7,949
Fine Gael	Patrick McGovern	17.5	6,261	6,951	7,254	
Labour	Michael Keating	8.6	3,096	3,815	4,153	5,146
Fine Gael	John McGorry	8.2	2,941	3,094	3,153	
Electorate: 46,519 Valid: 35,851 Quota: 7,171 Turnout: 77.1%

=== 1937 general election ===
1937 general election: Cavan
Party	Candidate	FPv%	Count					
Party	Candidate	FPv%	1	2	3	4	5	6
Fianna Fáil	Patrick Smith	23.1	8,446					
Independent	John James Cole	17.6	6,458	6,469	6,559	6,790	6,871	6,959
Fine Gael	Patrick McGovern	16.0	5,868	5,884	6,062	6,921	7,176	7,410
Fine Gael	John Joe O'Reilly	12.4	4,530	4,554	4,846	5,290	5,412	5,618
Fianna Fáil	Michael Sheridan	10.8	3,943	4,838	5,797	5,996	9,122	
Fianna Fáil	Bernard Fay	9.4	3,439	3,510	3,688	3,839		
Independent	Patrick Farrell	5.5	2,009	2,039	2,160			
Independent	James Smith	5.3	1,946	2,017				
Electorate: 47,008 Valid: 36,639 Quota: 7,328 Turnout: 77.9%

=== 1933 general election ===
1933 general election: Cavan
Party	Candidate	FPv%	Count				
Party	Candidate	FPv%	1	2	3	4	5
Fianna Fáil	Patrick Smith	24.5	9,446				
Fianna Fáil	Michael Sheridan	22.7	8,740				
Independent	John James Cole	17.3	6,675	6,771	6,814	6,897	7,051
Cumann na nGaedheal	John Joe O'Reilly	12.9	4,966	5,448	5,672	6,674	7,806
National Centre Party	John O'Hanlon	11.8	4,560	4,982	5,282		
National Centre Party	Patrick McGovern	10.7	4,103	4,850	5,324	8,985	
Electorate: 47,304 Valid: 38,490 Quota: 7,699 Turnout: 81.4%

=== 1932 general election ===
1932 general election: Cavan
Party	Candidate	FPv%	Count			
Party	Candidate	FPv%	1	2	3	4
Fianna Fáil	Michael Sheridan	22.5	8,183			
Independent	John O'Hanlon	20.0	7,281	7,303		
Fianna Fáil	Patrick Smith	19.6	7,154	8,012		
Independent	John James Cole	16.7	6,083	6,085	6,375	6,398
Cumann na nGaedheal	John Joe O'Reilly	13.8	5,023	5,034	7,048	7,159
Cumann na nGaedheal	Patrick Baxter	7.4	2,697	2,702		
Electorate: 47,302 Valid: 36,421 Quota: 7,285 Turnout: 77.0%

=== September 1927 general election ===
September 1927 general election: Cavan
Party	Candidate	FPv%	Count			
Party	Candidate	FPv%	1	2	3	4
Cumann na nGaedheal	John Joe O'Reilly	19.1	6,652	7,858		
Fianna Fáil	Patrick Smith	18.7	6,496	6,732	6,985	
Independent	John O'Hanlon	17.7	6,154	8,338		
Independent	John James Cole	17.6	6,136	6,433	6,631	6,795
Fianna Fáil	Michael Sheridan	14.0	4,862	5,225	5,767	6,067
Farmers' Party	Patrick Baxter	12.9	4,484			
Electorate: 54,955 Valid: 34,784 Quota: 6,957 Turnout: 63.3%

=== June 1927 general election ===
June 1927 general election: Cavan
Party	Candidate	FPv%	Count					
Party	Candidate	FPv%	1	2	3	4	5	6
Independent	John O'Hanlon	32.7	11,152					
Cumann na nGaedheal	John Joe O'Reilly	16.7	5,690	6,947				
Fianna Fáil	Patrick Smith	15.8	5,396	5,876	5,946	5,961	8,955	
Independent	John James Cole	15.1	5,158	5,336	5,376	5,390	5,408	5,470
Farmers' Party	Patrick Baxter	9.7	3,313	5,081	5,311	5,373	5,488	6,179
Fianna Fáil	Michael Sheridan	8.3	2,830	3,260	3,375	3,400		
Independent	Seán Milroy	1.8	614	822				
Electorate: 54,955 Valid: 34,153 Quota: 6,831 Turnout: 62.2%

=== 1925 by-election ===
National Group TD Seán Milroy (elected in 1923 for Cumann na nGaedheal) resigned on 30 October 1925. A writ of election to fill the vacancy was moved on 18 February 1925. A by-election was held on 11 March 1925.

1925 by-election: Cavan
Party	Candidate	FPv%	Count	
Party	Candidate	FPv%	1	2
Cumann na nGaedheal	John Joe O'Reilly	38.5	12,560	12,980
Farmers' Party	John O'Hanlon	31.5	10,285	12,119
Republican	Philip Baxter	30.0	9,774	
Electorate: 54,419 Valid: 32,619 Quota: 16,310 Turnout: 59.9%

=== 1923 general election ===
1923 general election: Cavan
Party	Candidate	FPv%	Count						
Party	Candidate	FPv%	1	2	3	4	5	6	7
Farmers' Party	Patrick Baxter	18.8	6,264	6,488	6,928				
Republican	Patrick Smith	18.4	6,112	6,155	6,213	6,283	6,358	6,429	6,519
Independent	John James Cole	16.5	5,476	5,483	5,508	5,528	5,609	5,691	5,798
Cumann na nGaedheal	Seán Milroy	15.4	5,109	5,134	5,205	5,251	5,578	6,680	
Labour	Patrick Sheridan	11.3	3,749	3,779	3,847	3,873	3,930	4,195	4,628
Cumann na nGaedheal	Walter L. Cole	7.4	2,448	2,463	2,491	2,515	2,606	3,093	
Cumann na nGaedheal	Thomas McKenna	6.0	2,010	2,133	2,166	2,215	2,323		
Independent	Patrick McQuaid	2.4	810	838	861	870			
Farmers' Party	Henry O'Reilly	2.2	728	774					
Farmers' Party	Patrick Farrelly	1.7	559						
Electorate: 55,104 Valid: 33,265 Quota: 6,654 Turnout: 60.4%

=== 1922 general election ===
1922 general election: Cavan
Party	Candidate	FPv%	Count		
Party	Candidate	FPv%	1	2	3
Sinn Féin (Pro-Treaty)	Arthur Griffith	54.4	13,101		
Farmers' Party	Patrick Baxter	23.3	5,620	5,994	6,015
Sinn Féin (Pro-Treaty)	Walter L. Cole	20.0	4,807	6,490	
Sinn Féin (Pro-Treaty)	Seán Milroy	2.3	565	5,585	6,030
Electorate: 44,022 Valid: 24,093 Quota: 6,024 Turnout: 54.7%

=== 1921 general election ===
1921 general election: Cavan (uncontested)
Party	Candidate
Sinn Féin	Peter Paul Galligan
Sinn Féin	Arthur Griffith
Sinn Féin	Seán Milroy
