= John James Cole =

Irish politician (1874–1959)

Teachta Dála
- In office July 1937 – May 1944
- In office September 1927 – February 1932
- In office August 1923 – June 1927
- Constituency: Cavan

Personal details
- Born: 1874 Holywood, County Down, Ireland
- Died: 24 May 1959 (aged 84–85) Belturbet, County Cavan, Ireland
- Party: Independent
- Spouse: Jeanie Jones (m. 1909)
- Children: 3, including John
- Relatives: Thomas Loftus Cole (brother)
- Education: Sullivan Upper School

John James Cole (1874 – 24 May 1959) was an Irish politician, farmer and auctioneer.

== Early and personal life ==
Born in Kinnegar, Holywood, County Down in 1874. He married Jeanie Jones in 1909, and they had one son and two daughters.

Cole studied at the Sullivan Upper School in Holywood. He entered business after leaving school. He moved to Cavan town to establish a pharmacy; he later became an auctioneer, land agent, farmer and cattle breeder.

== Politics ==
He was first elected to Dáil Éireann as an independent Teachta Dála (TD) for the Cavan constituency at the 1923 general election. He lost his seat at the June 1927 general election but regained it at the September 1927 general election. He again lost his seat at the 1932 general election and was an unsuccessful candidate at the 1933 general election. He was elected again at the 1937 general election and was re-elected at the 1938 and 1943 general elections. He again lost his seat at the 1944 general election and was an unsuccessful candidate at the 1948, 1951, 1954 and 1957 general elections.

A prominent unionist before 1922, he was a member of the Orange Order and was grand master of the County Cavan lodge. In 1937, he said "those whom I represent ... you can call them ex-Unionists, or, if you wish to be more precise, you can call them Protestants".

His son John Copeland Cole was a Senator from 1957 to 1969. His brother Thomas Loftus Cole, was an MP for Belfast East.

He died in Belturbet in 1959.

== See also ==
- Families in the Oireachtas

| Dáil | Election | Deputy (Party) | Deputy (Party) | Deputy (Party) | Deputy (Party) |
|---|---|---|---|---|---|
| 2nd | 1921 | Arthur Griffith (SF) | Paul Galligan (SF) | Seán Milroy (SF) | 3 seats 1921–1923 |
| 3rd | 1922 | Arthur Griffith (PT-SF) | Walter L. Cole (PT-SF) | Seán Milroy (PT-SF) | 3 seats 1921–1923 |
| 4th | 1923 | Patrick Smith (Rep) | John James Cole (Ind.) | Seán Milroy (CnaG) | Patrick Baxter (FP) |
| 4th | 1925 by-election | Patrick Smith (Rep) | John James Cole (Ind.) | John Joe O'Reilly (CnaG) | Patrick Baxter (FP) |
| 5th | 1927 (Jun) | Paddy Smith (FF) | John O'Hanlon (Ind.) | John Joe O'Reilly (CnaG) | Patrick Baxter (FP) |
| 6th | 1927 (Sep) | Paddy Smith (FF) | John O'Hanlon (Ind.) | John Joe O'Reilly (CnaG) | John James Cole (Ind.) |
| 7th | 1932 | Paddy Smith (FF) | John O'Hanlon (Ind.) | John Joe O'Reilly (CnaG) | Michael Sheridan (FF) |
| 8th | 1933 | Paddy Smith (FF) | Patrick McGovern (NCP) | John Joe O'Reilly (CnaG) | Michael Sheridan (FF) |
| 9th | 1937 | Paddy Smith (FF) | Patrick McGovern (FG) | John James Cole (Ind.) | Michael Sheridan (FF) |
| 10th | 1938 | Paddy Smith (FF) | Patrick McGovern (FG) | John James Cole (Ind.) | Michael Sheridan (FF) |
| 11th | 1943 | Paddy Smith (FF) | Patrick O'Reilly (CnaT) | John James Cole (Ind.) | Michael Sheridan (FF) |
| 12th | 1944 | Paddy Smith (FF) | Patrick O'Reilly (CnaT) | Tom O'Reilly (Ind.) | Michael Sheridan (FF) |
| 13th | 1948 | Paddy Smith (FF) | John Tully (CnaP) | Patrick O'Reilly (Ind.) | Michael Sheridan (FF) |
| 14th | 1951 | Paddy Smith (FF) | John Tully (CnaP) | Patrick O'Reilly (FG) | Michael Sheridan (FF) |
| 15th | 1954 | Paddy Smith (FF) | John Tully (CnaP) | Patrick O'Reilly (FG) | Michael Sheridan (FF) |
| 16th | 1957 | Paddy Smith (FF) | John Tully (CnaP) | Patrick O'Reilly (FG) | Michael Sheridan (FF) |
| 17th | 1961 | Paddy Smith (FF) | Séamus Dolan (FF) | Patrick O'Reilly (FG) | 3 seats 1961–1977 |
| 18th | 1965 | Paddy Smith (FF) | John Tully (CnaP) | Tom Fitzpatrick (FG) | 3 seats 1961–1977 |
| 19th | 1969 | Paddy Smith (FF) | Patrick O'Reilly (FG) | Tom Fitzpatrick (FG) | 3 seats 1961–1977 |
| 20th | 1973 | Paddy Smith (FF) | John Wilson (FF) | Tom Fitzpatrick (FG) | 3 seats 1961–1977 |
| 21st | 1977 | Constituency abolished. See Cavan–Monaghan | | | |
