= 1959 Fianna Fáil leadership election =

Political party leadership election in Ireland

22 June 1959	1966 →
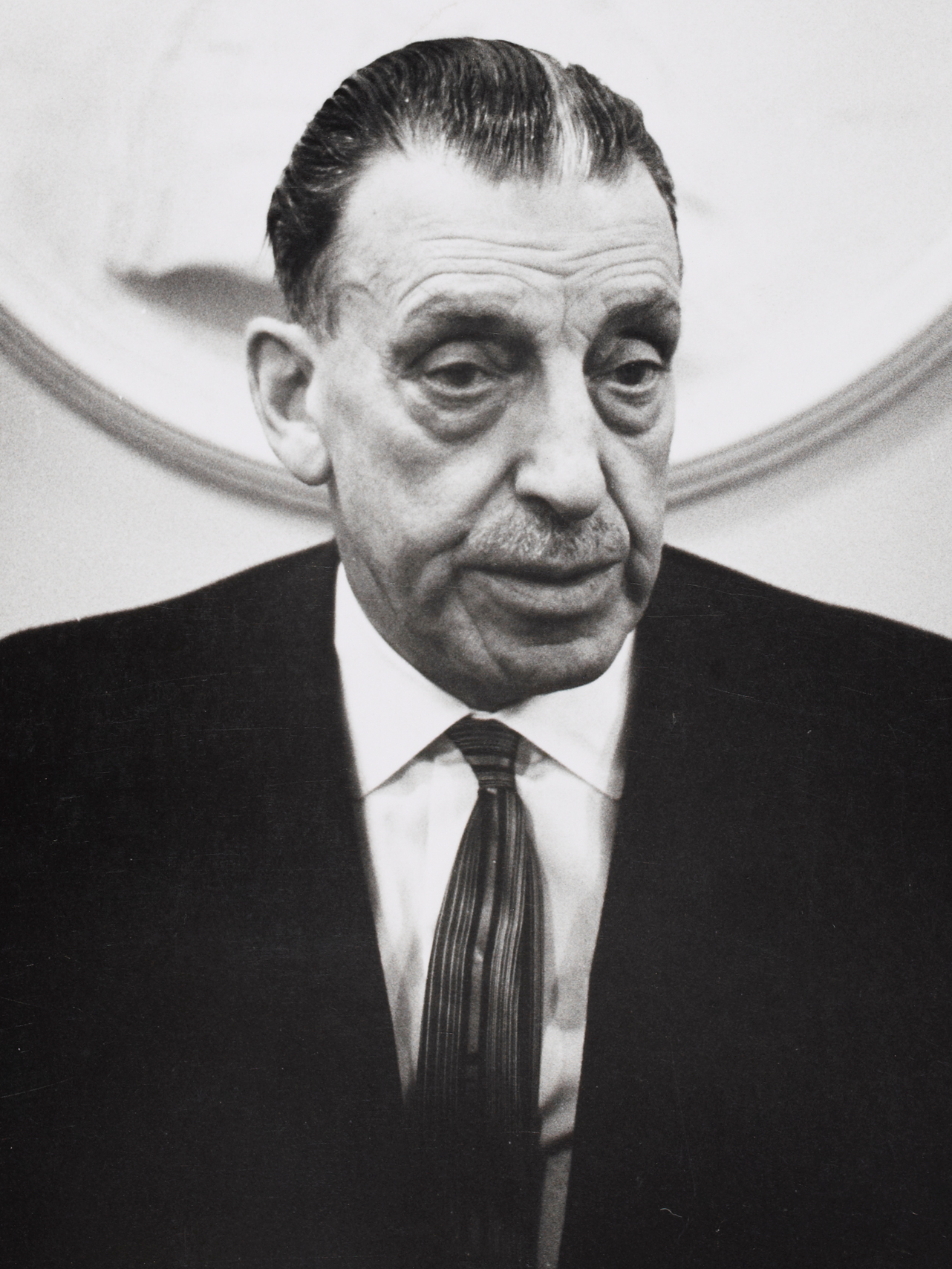
Candidate	Seán Lemass
Percentage	Unopposed
Leader before election
Éamon de Valera
Elected Leader
Seán Lemass

The 1959 Fianna Fáil leadership election began in June 1959, when Éamon de Valera resigned as party leader and Taoiseach to take up the post of President of Ireland. It was the first leadership election for the party as De Valera had been leader since the foundation of the party in 1926, and had served as Taoiseach on three occasions. His successor was elected by the members of the Fianna Fáil parliamentary party on 22 June 1959. After one ballot the election was won by Seán Lemass. He was elected Taoiseach in Dáil Éireann on the following day.

== Candidates ==
=== Standing ===
- Seán Lemass, Tánaiste and Minister for Industry and Commerce

=== Declined to stand ===
- Frank Aiken, Minister for Foreign Affairs
- Seán MacEntee, Minister for Health
- James Ryan, Minister for Finance

== Campaign ==
Seán Lemass had been a founding member of Fianna Fáil, and had been a minister in every Fianna Fáil cabinet since 1932. He had been Éamon de Valera's "heir-apparent" since his appointment as Tánaiste in 1945. It was widely assumed amongst the general public, and was an accepted fact within the party, that Lemass would succeed de Valera whenever "the Chief" decided to retire. In 1959 that opportunity arose when de Valera was elected President of Ireland.

There were several other contenders for the post of party leader. In the 1930s and 1940s Seán MacEntee was considered Lemass's closest rival for the top job. However, his poor performance as Minister for Finance in the 1950s discredited his reputation. Frank Aiken was also considered a very able Foreign Minister and a potential candidate. The British embassy in Dublin kept London informed of the changes. They speculated that Aiken and Lemass would be the two main contenders, however, James Ryan would be elected as a compromise candidate. However, the divisions that they believed existed between Lemass and Aiken were not true.

When the Fianna Fáil parliamentary party met on 22 June Seán MacEntee proposed Lemass as leader, with Frank Aiken seconding the motion. With no other candidates standing, Lemass was thus acclaimed as the second leader of Fianna Fáil.
