= 1965 Irish general election =

Election to the 18th Dáil

- 7 April 1965

144 seats in Dáil Éireann (Note: Including Patrick Hogan (Lab), returned automatically for Clare as outgoing Ceann Comhairle, under Art. 16.6 of the Constitution and the Electoral Act 1963.) 73 seats needed for a majority
- Turnout: 75.1% ▲4.5 pp
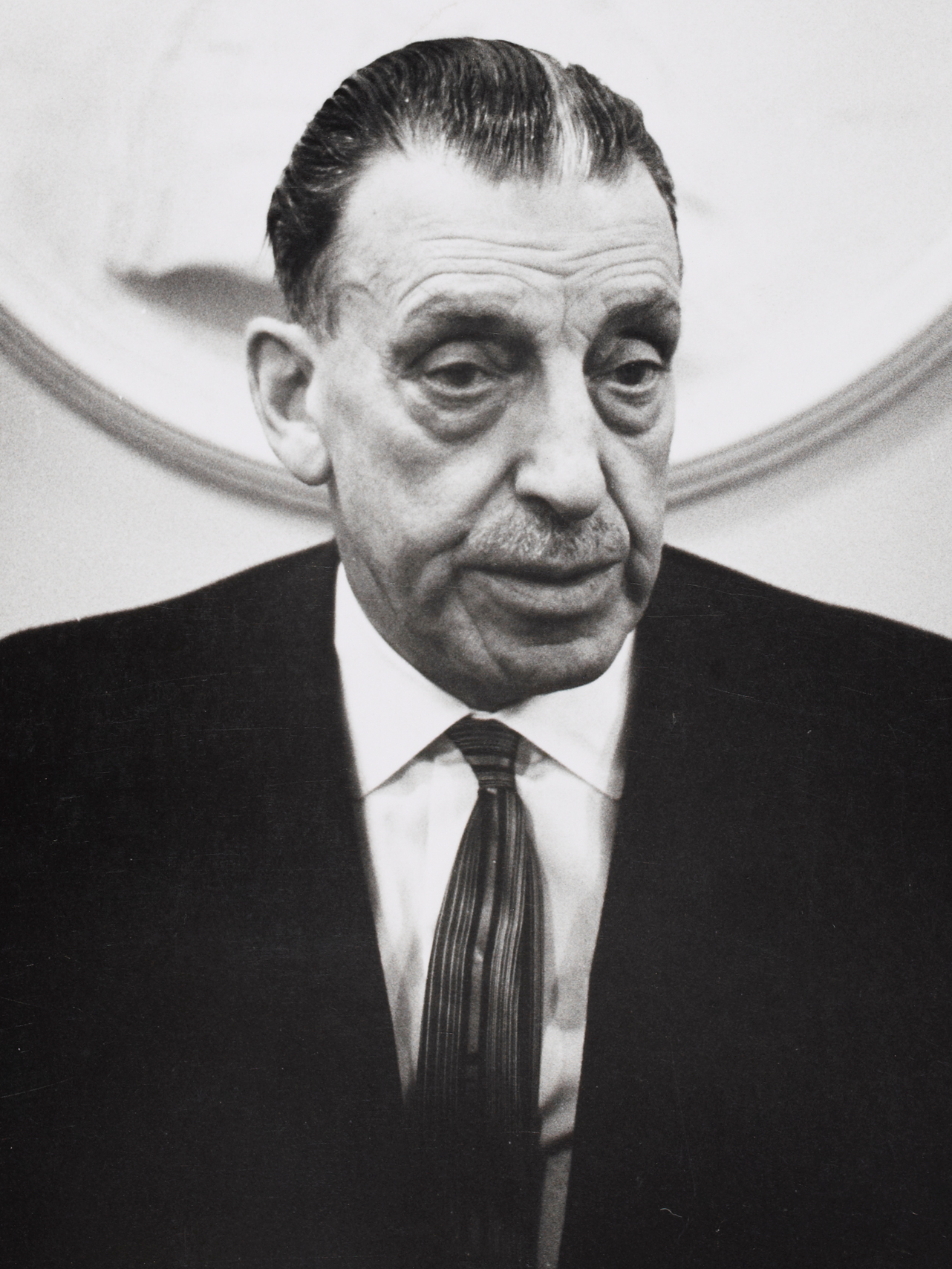

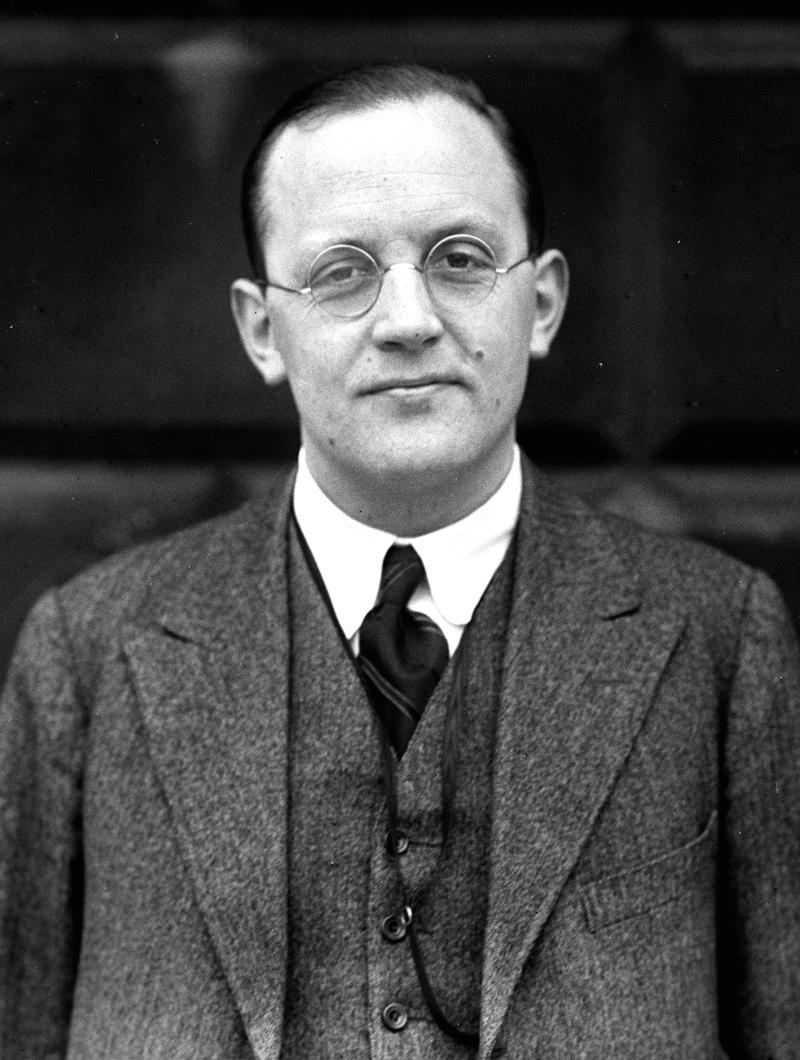

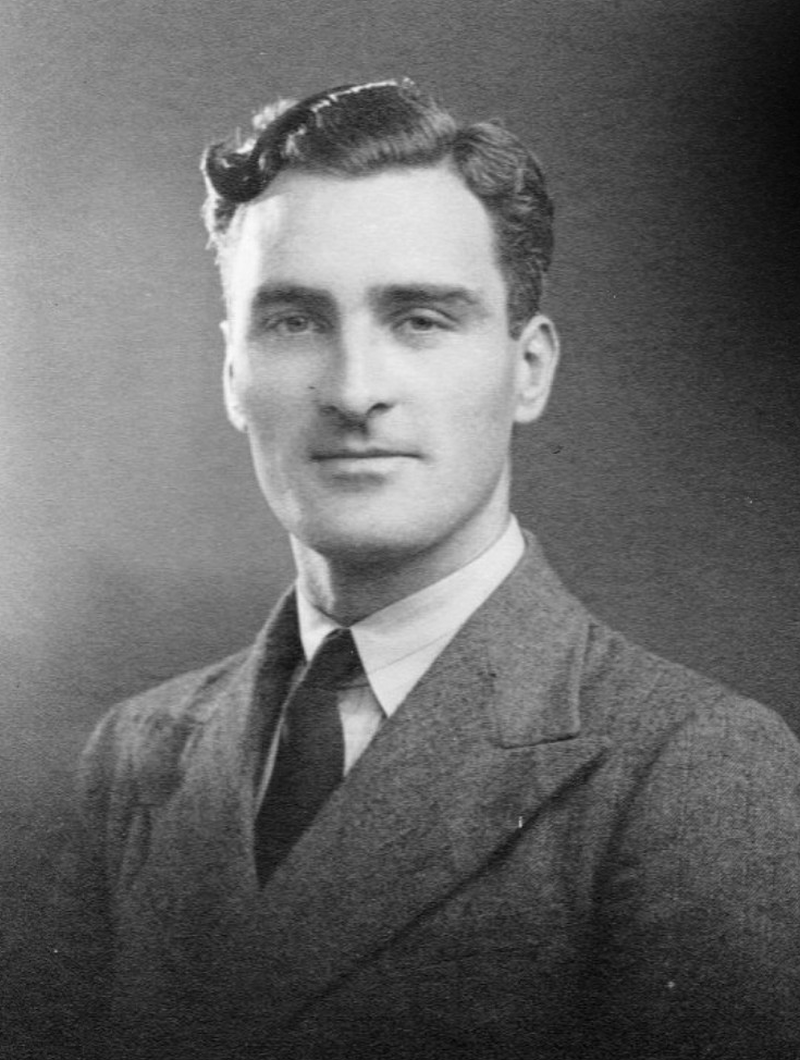

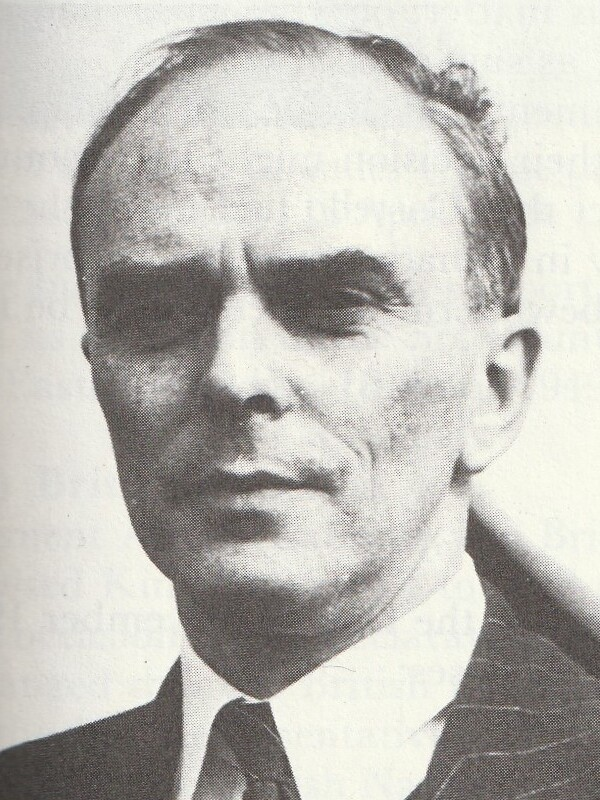
	First party	Second party
Leader	Seán Lemass	James Dillon
Party	Fianna Fáil	Fine Gael
Leader since	22 June 1959	21 March 1959
Leader's seat	Dublin South-Central	Monaghan
Last election	70 seats, 43.8%	47 seats, 32.0%
Seats before	71	48
Seats won	72	47
Seat change	▲2	0
Popular vote	597,414	427,081
Percentage	47.7%	34.1%
Swing	▲3.9 pp	▲2.1 pp
	Third party	Fourth party
Leader	Brendan Corish	Seán MacBride
Party	Labour	Clann na Poblachta
Leader since	2 March 1960	21 January 1946
Leader's seat	Wexford	n/a
Last election	16 seats, 11.6%	1 seat, 1.1%
Seats before	18	1
Seats won	22	1
Seat change	▲6	0
Popular vote	192,740	9,427
Percentage	15.4%	0.8%
Swing	▲3.7 pp	▼0.3 pp
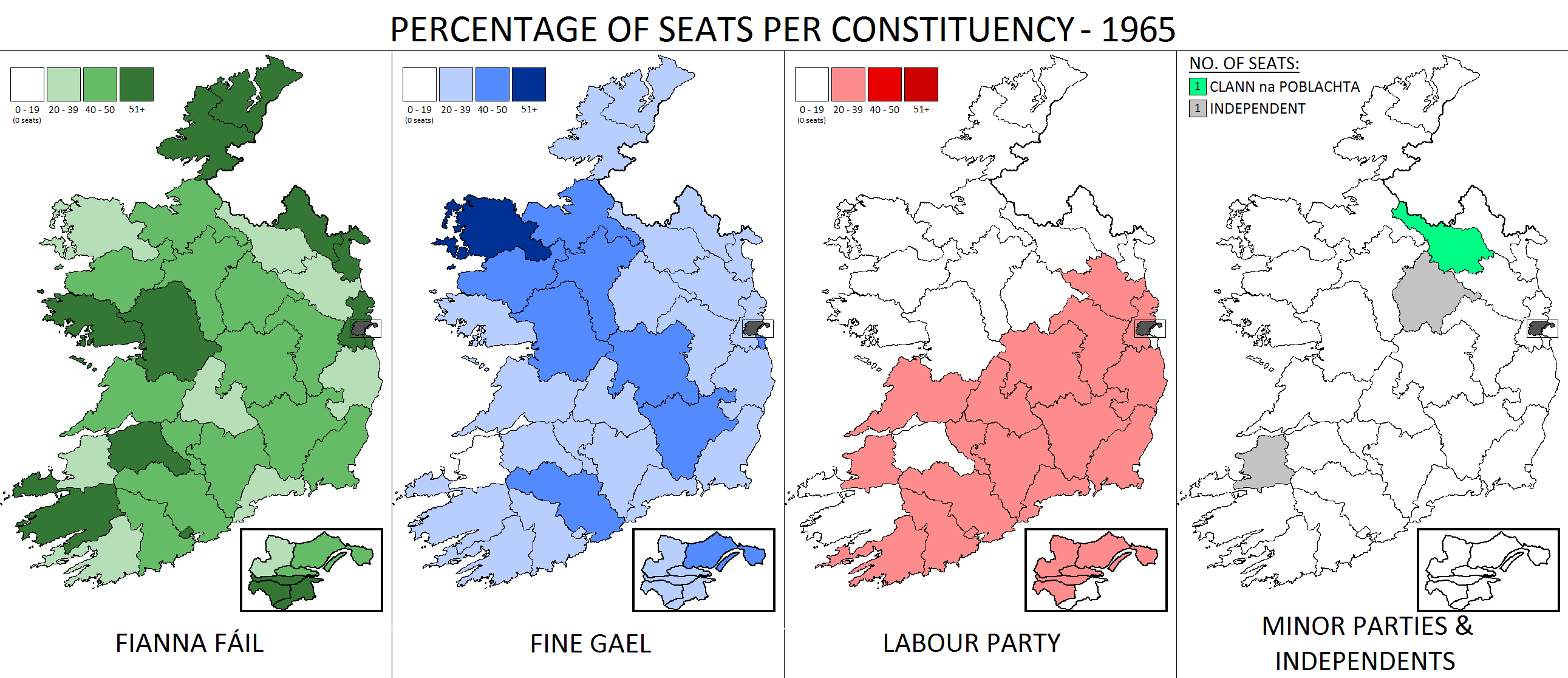
Taoiseach before election
Seán Lemass
Fianna Fáil
Taoiseach after election
Seán Lemass
Fianna Fáil

The 1965 Irish general election to the 18th Dáil was held on Wednesday, 7 April, following the dissolution of the 17th Dáil on 18 March by President Éamon de Valera on the request of Taoiseach Seán Lemass. The general election took place in 38 Dáil constituencies throughout Ireland for 144 seats in Dáil Éireann, the house of representatives of the Oireachtas. The governing Fianna Fáil saw a slight increase, though did not obtain a majority.

The 18th Dáil met at Leinster House on 21 April to nominate the Taoiseach for appointment by the president and to approve the appointment of a new government of Ireland. Lemass was re-appointed Taoiseach, forming the 11th government of Ireland, a single-party minority Fianna Fáil government.

== Campaign ==
The general election of 1965 followed the failure of the governing Fianna Fáil to gain a seat in a by-election on 10 March 1965. The success of Eileen Desmond of the Labour Party in Cork Mid in holding a seat previously held by her husband Dan Desmond, led to an unacceptable mathematical situation with regard to the government's majority. On 18 March, the Taoiseach, Seán Lemass dissolved the Dáil and the campaign began in earnest.

Fianna Fáil ran its campaign on its record in government. Over the last number of years, the economy had seen a huge improvement and the party played up on its record in government. The party also played up heavily on the personality of the party leader with the slogan "Let Lemass Lead On". Fine Gael put forward a comprehensive manifesto, which included the establishment of a government department concerned with economic planning. However, the older, conservative members of the party did not warm to the new turn the party was taking.

== Television and radio ==
This was the first Irish general election to be covered on television by state broadcaster RTÉ, which had formed on 31 December 1961. Election Newsroom was broadcast live on Telefís Éireann from their Donnybrook studios in Dublin, presented by John O'Donoghue with analysis provided by John Healy (The Irish Times), John O'Sullivan (The Cork Examiner), Garret FitzGerald and Professor Basil Chubb. Cameras were present in four count centres: Bolton Street (Dublin), Wexford, Cork and Monaghan. The GPO provided direct links as results were announced. Raidió Éireann provided special coverage from 3 pm on the day of the count due to the coverage on Telefís Éireann. It was a new approach to election coverage on the state's radio service, which began broadcasting in 1926.

== Result ==
Election to the 18th Dáil – 7 April 1965
Party	Leader	Seats	±	% of seats	First pref. votes	% FPv	±%
Fianna Fáil	Seán Lemass	72	+2	50.0	597,414	47.7	+3.9
Fine Gael	James Dillon	47	0	32.6	427,081	34.1	+2.1
Labour	Brendan Corish	22	+6	15.3	192,740	15.4	+3.8
Clann na Poblachta	Seán MacBride (Note: After the election, while Seán MacBride was leader of Clann na Poblachta, John Tully became leader and the sole member of the parliamentary party.)	1	0	0.7	9,427	0.8	–0.3
Irish Workers' Party	Michael O'Riordan	0	0	0	183	0.0	0
Independent	N/A	2	–4	1.4	26,277	2.1	–3.5
Spoilt votes					11,544	—N/a	—N/a
Total		144	0	100	1,264,666	100	—N/a
Electorate/Turnout					1,683,019	75.1%	—N/a

=== Voting summary ===
First preference vote
Fianna Fáil	47.67%
Fine Gael	34.08%
Labour	15.38%
Clann na Poblachta	0.75%
Irish Workers' Party	0.01%
Independent	2.10%

=== Seats summary ===
Dáil seats
Fianna Fáil	50.00%
Fine Gael	32.64%
Labour	15.28%
Clann na Poblachta	0.69%
Independent	1.39%

== Government formation and aftermath ==
Fianna Fáil formed the 11th Government of Ireland, a single-party government led by Seán Lemass as Taoiseach. Lemass had been in office since 1959.

James Dillon resigned as leader of Fine Gael immediately after the result was announced.

In November 1966, Lemass resigned as Fianna Fáil leader and Taoiseach, and was succeeded in both positions by Jack Lynch, who formed the 12th Government of Ireland.

== Changes in membership ==
=== First time TDs ===
- David Andrews
- Luke Belton
- Ben Briscoe
- Flor Crowley
- Tom Fitzpatrick (Cavan)
- Tom Fitzpatrick (Dublin)
- James Kennedy
- Patrick Lenihan
- Gerry L'Estrange
- Michael Lyons
- Bobby Molloy
- John O'Connell
- Michael O'Leary
- Pearse Wyse

=== Re-elected TDs ===
- Gus Healy
- Denis Larkin

=== Outgoing TDs ===
- Gerald Bartley
- Robert Briscoe
- Dan Breen
- Joseph Blowick
- James Ryan

=== Defeated TDs ===
- Seán Brady
- Jack McQuillan
- John Moher
- Denis J. O'Sullivan
- Eugene Timmons

== Seanad election ==
The Dáil election was followed by an election to the 11th Seanad.
