= 5th Dáil =

TDs from June to August 1927

←	4th Dáil	6th Dáil	→

Overview
- Legislative body: Dáil Éireann
- Jurisdiction: Irish Free State
- Meeting place: Leinster House
- Term: 23 June 1927 – 25 August 1927
- Election: June 1927 general election
- Government: 3rd executive council
- Members: 153
- Ceann Comhairle: Michael Hayes
- President of the Executive Council: W. T. Cosgrave
- Vice-President of the Executive Council: Ernest Blythe — Kevin O'Higgins until 10 July 1927
- Chief Whip: Eamonn Duggan — James Dolan until 24 June 1927
- Leader of the Opposition: Éamon de Valera — Thomas Johnson until 11 August 1927

Sessions
- 1st: 23 June 1927 – 16 August 1927

The 5th Dáil was elected at the June 1927 general election on 9 June 1927 and met on 23 June 1927. The members of Dáil Éireann, the Chamber of Deputies of the Oireachtas (legislature) of the Irish Free State, are known as TDs. It was one of two houses of the Oireachtas, sitting with the First Seanad constituted as the 1925 Seanad. The 5th Dáil was dissolved on 25 August 1927 by Governor-General Tim Healy, at the advice of the President of the Executive Council W. T. Cosgrave. The 5th Dáil is the shortest Dáil in the history of the state, lasting only 63 days.

== Composition of the 5th Dáil ==
- 3rd Executive Council
- Providing confidence and supply

Party	June 1927	Aug. 1927	Change
Cumann na nGaedheal	47	47	Steady
Fianna Fáil	44	43	▼1
Labour	22	22	Steady
Farmers' Party	11	11	Steady
National League	8	6	▼2
Sinn Féin	5	5	Steady
Independent	16	18	▲2
Ceann Comhairle	—N/a	1	▲1
Total	153		

The 3rd executive council was formed by Cumann na nGaedheal with support from the Farmers' Party.

In line with its policy of abstentionism, the Sinn Féin TDs did not take their seats. Fianna Fáil also had a policy of abstentionism and their TDs did not take their seats when the Dáil met, but in August 1927, they abandoned the policy, signing the Oath of Allegiance, and took their seats, leading the executive council to lose its functional majority. Labour led the opposition until Fianna Fáil took their seats.

== Ceann Comhairle ==
On 23 June 1927, Michael Hayes (CnaG), who had been Ceann Comhairle since September 1922, was proposed by W. T. Cosgrave (CnaG) and seconded by Thomas Johnson (Lab) for the position, and was approved without a vote. On 1 July 1927, James Dolan (CnaG) was proposed by Eamonn Duggan (CnaG) as Leas-Cheann Comhairle. He was approved by a vote of 54 to 20.

== TDs by constituency ==
The list of the 153 TDs elected, is given in alphabetical order by Dáil constituency.

Members of the 5th Dáil
Constituency	Name	Party
Carlow–Kilkenny	W. T. Cosgrave	Cumann na nGaedheal
Carlow–Kilkenny	Edward Doyle	Labour
Carlow–Kilkenny	Denis Gorey	Cumann na nGaedheal
Carlow–Kilkenny	Thomas Derrig	Fianna Fáil
Carlow–Kilkenny	Richard Holohan	Farmers' Party
Cavan	Patrick Baxter	Farmers' Party
Cavan	John O'Hanlon	Independent
Cavan	John Joe O'Reilly	Cumann na nGaedheal
Cavan	Paddy Smith	Fianna Fáil
Clare	Éamon de Valera	Fianna Fáil
Clare	Thomas Falvey	Farmers' Party
Clare	Patrick Hogan	Labour
Clare	Patrick Houlihan	Fianna Fáil
Clare	Patrick Kelly	Cumann na nGaedheal
Cork Borough	Richard Anthony	Labour
Cork Borough	Barry Egan	Cumann na nGaedheal
Cork Borough	Seán French	Fianna Fáil
Cork Borough	John Horgan	National League
Cork Borough	J. J. Walsh	Cumann na nGaedheal
Cork East	Martin Corry	Fianna Fáil
Cork East	John Daly	Independent
Cork East	Michael Hennessy	Cumann na nGaedheal
Cork East	David Kent	Sinn Féin
Cork East	David O'Gorman	Farmers' Party
Cork North	Daniel Corkery	Independent
Cork North	Timothy Quill	Labour
Cork North	Daniel Vaughan	Farmers' Party
Cork West	Thomas Mullins	Fianna Fáil
Cork West	Timothy J. Murphy	Labour
Cork West	Timothy O'Donovan	Farmers' Party
Cork West	Timothy Sheehy	Cumann na nGaedheal
Cork West	Jasper Wolfe	Independent
Donegal	Neal Blaney	Fianna Fáil
Donegal	Frank Carney	Fianna Fáil
Donegal	Eugene Doherty	Cumann na nGaedheal
Donegal	Hugh Law	Cumann na nGaedheal
Donegal	Michael Óg McFadden	Cumann na nGaedheal
Donegal	Daniel McMenamin	National League
Donegal	James Myles	Independent
Donegal	John White	Farmers' Party
Dublin North	Alfie Byrne	Independent
Dublin North	John Byrne	Cumann na nGaedheal
Dublin North	Kathleen Clarke	Fianna Fáil
Dublin North	Margaret Collins-O'Driscoll	Cumann na nGaedheal
Dublin North	Denis Cullen	Labour
Dublin North	Richard Mulcahy	Cumann na nGaedheal
Dublin North	Seán T. O'Kelly	Fianna Fáil
Dublin North	Oscar Traynor	Sinn Féin
Dublin South	James Beckett	Cumann na nGaedheal
Dublin South	Peadar Doyle	Cumann na nGaedheal
Dublin South	Myles Keogh	Independent
Dublin South	Thomas Lawlor	Labour
Dublin South	Seán Lemass	Fianna Fáil
Dublin South	Constance Markievicz	Fianna Fáil
Dublin South	Vincent Rice	National League
Dublin County	Patrick Belton	Fianna Fáil
Dublin County	Bryan Cooper	Independent
Dublin County	Desmond FitzGerald	Cumann na nGaedheal
Dublin County	John Good	Independent
Dublin County	Thomas Johnson	Labour
Dublin County	Seán MacEntee	Fianna Fáil
Dublin County	Batt O'Connor	Cumann na nGaedheal
Dublin County	Kevin O'Higgins	Cumann na nGaedheal
Dublin University	Ernest Alton	Independent
Dublin University	James Craig	Independent
Dublin University	William Thrift	Independent
Galway	Seán Broderick	Cumann na nGaedheal
Galway	William Duffy	National League
Galway	Frank Fahy	Fianna Fáil
Galway	Patrick Hogan	Cumann na nGaedheal
Galway	Mark Killilea Snr	Fianna Fáil
Galway	Gilbert Lynch	Labour
Galway	Martin McDonogh	Cumann na nGaedheal
Galway	Thomas Powell	Fianna Fáil
Galway	Seán Tubridy	Fianna Fáil
Kerry	James Crowley	Cumann na nGaedheal
Kerry	Fionán Lynch	Cumann na nGaedheal
Kerry	Tom McEllistrim	Fianna Fáil
Kerry	William O'Leary	Fianna Fáil
Kerry	Thomas O'Reilly	Fianna Fáil
Kerry	John O'Sullivan	Cumann na nGaedheal
Kerry	Austin Stack	Sinn Féin
Kildare	Domhnall Ua Buachalla	Fianna Fáil
Kildare	Hugh Colohan	Labour
Kildare	George Wolfe	Cumann na nGaedheal
Leitrim–Sligo	Michael Carter	Farmers' Party
Leitrim–Sligo	Frank Carty	Fianna Fáil
Leitrim–Sligo	James Dolan	Cumann na nGaedheal
Leitrim–Sligo	John Hennigan	Cumann na nGaedheal
Leitrim–Sligo	Samuel Holt	Fianna Fáil
Leitrim–Sligo	John Jinks	National League
Leitrim–Sligo	Martin Roddy	Cumann na nGaedheal
Leix–Offaly	Patrick Boland	Fianna Fáil
Leix–Offaly	William Davin	Labour
Leix–Offaly	James Dwyer	Cumann na nGaedheal
Leix–Offaly	John Gill	Labour
Leix–Offaly	Thomas Tynan	Fianna Fáil
Limerick	George C. Bennett	Cumann na nGaedheal
Limerick	Patrick Clancy	Labour
Limerick	James Colbert	Fianna Fáil
Limerick	Tadhg Crowley	Fianna Fáil
Limerick	Gilbert Hewson	Independent
Limerick	Michael Keyes	Labour
Limerick	Richard O'Connell	Cumann na nGaedheal
Longford–Westmeath	Henry Broderick	Labour
Longford–Westmeath	Hugh Garahan	Farmers' Party
Longford–Westmeath	Michael Kennedy	Fianna Fáil
Longford–Westmeath	Patrick Shaw	Cumann na nGaedheal
Longford–Westmeath	James Victory	Fianna Fáil
Louth	Frank Aiken	Fianna Fáil
Louth	James Coburn	National League
Louth	James Murphy	Cumann na nGaedheal
Mayo North	Michael Davis	Cumann na nGaedheal
Mayo North	Mark Henry	Cumann na nGaedheal
Mayo North	John Madden	Sinn Féin
Mayo North	P. J. Ruttledge	Fianna Fáil
Mayo South	James FitzGerald-Kenney	Cumann na nGaedheal
Mayo South	Michael Kilroy	Fianna Fáil
Mayo South	Eugene Mullen	Fianna Fáil
Mayo South	Martin Nally	Cumann na nGaedheal
Mayo South	Thomas J. O'Connell	Labour
Meath	Eamonn Duggan	Cumann na nGaedheal
Meath	David Hall	Labour
Meath	Matthew O'Reilly	Fianna Fáil
Monaghan	Ernest Blythe	Cumann na nGaedheal
Monaghan	Alexander Haslett	Independent
Monaghan	Patrick MacCarvill	Fianna Fáil
National University	Arthur Clery	Independent
National University	Michael Hayes	Cumann na nGaedheal
National University	Patrick McGilligan	Cumann na nGaedheal
Roscommon	Michael Brennan	Independent
Roscommon	Gerald Boland	Fianna Fáil
Roscommon	Martin Conlon	Cumann na nGaedheal
Roscommon	Patrick O'Dowd	Fianna Fáil
Tipperary	Séamus Burke	Cumann na nGaedheal
Tipperary	Andrew Fogarty	Fianna Fáil
Tipperary	Seán Hayes	Fianna Fáil
Tipperary	John Hassett	Cumann na nGaedheal
Tipperary	Michael Heffernan	Farmers' Party
Tipperary	Daniel Morrissey	Labour
Tipperary	William O'Brien	Labour
Waterford	Caitlín Brugha	Sinn Féin
Waterford	Patrick Little	Fianna Fáil
Waterford	William Redmond	National League
Waterford	Vincent White	Cumann na nGaedheal
Wexford	Richard Corish	Labour
Wexford	Michael Doyle	Farmers' Party
Wexford	John Keating	National League
Wexford	James Ryan	Fianna Fáil
Wexford	James Shannon	Labour
Wicklow	James Everett	Labour
Wicklow	Séamus Moore	Fianna Fáil
Wicklow	Dermot O'Mahony	Cumann na nGaedheal

== Changes ==
Date	Constituency	Loss	Gain	Note
23 June 1927	National University	Cumann na nGaedheal	Ceann Comhairle	Michael Hayes takes office as Ceann Comhairle
10 July 1927	Dublin County	Cumann na nGaedheal		Death of Kevin O'Higgins
15 July 1927	Dublin South	Fianna Fáil		Death of Constance Markievicz
26 July 1927	Dublin County	Fianna Fáil	Independent	Patrick Belton takes Oath of Allegiance in contravention of Fianna Fáil policy
August 1927	Cork North	Independent	Fianna Fáil	Daniel Corkery joins Fianna Fáil
11 August 1927	Dublin South	National League	Independent	Vincent Rice resigns from the National League after failing to take the party pledge and supporting the government
18 August 1927	Leitrim–Sligo	National League	Independent	John Jinks resigns from the National League after abstaining on vote of no confidence
24 August 1927	Dublin County		Cumann na nGaedheal	Gearóid O'Sullivan holds the seat vacated by the death of O'Higgins
24 August 1927	Dublin South		Cumann na nGaedheal	Thomas Hennessy gains the seat vacated by the death of Markievicz

The Dáil was dissolved on 25 August 1927, with O'Sullivan and Hennessy not taking their seats in the 5th Dáil.

After the dissolution of the Dáil, Independent TDs Bryan Cooper (Dublin County), John Daly (Cork East), Myles Keogh (Dublin South) and Vincent Rice (Dublin South) joined Cumann na nGaedheal, standing for the party in the September general election.
