= 6th Dáil =

TDs from September 1927 to 1932

←	5th Dáil	7th Dáil	→

Overview
- Legislative body: Dáil Éireann
- Jurisdiction: Irish Free State
- Meeting place: Leinster House
- Term: 11 October 1927 – 29 January 1932
- Election: September 1927 general election
- Government: 4th executive council (1927–1930); 5th executive council (1930–1932)
- Members: 153
- Ceann Comhairle: Michael Hayes
- President of the Executive Council: W. T. Cosgrave
- Vice-President of the Executive Council: Ernest Blythe
- Chief Whip: Eamonn Duggan
- Leader of the Opposition: Éamon de Valera

Sessions
- 1st: 11 October 1927 – 31 July 1928
- 2nd: 10 October 1928 – 31 July 1929
- 3rd: 23 October 1929 – 17 July 1930
- 4th: 19 November 1930 – 17 July 1931
- 5th: 14 October 1931 – 17 December 1931

The 6th Dáil was elected at the September 1927 general election on 15 September 1927 and met on 11 October 1927. The members of Dáil Éireann, the Chamber of Deputies of the Oireachtas (legislature) of the Irish Free State, are known as TDs. It was one of two houses of the Oireachtas, sitting with the First Seanad constituted as the 1925 Seanad, the 1928 Seanad and the 1931 Seanad. The 6th Dáil was dissolved on 29 January 1932 by Governor-General James McNeill, at the request of the President of the Executive Council W. T. Cosgrave. The 6th Dáil lasted 4 years, 110 days.

== Composition of the 6th Dáil ==
- 4th, 5th Executive Council
- Providing confidence and supply after April 1930 (Note: 10 independents supported the government, becoming 12 after the disbandment of the National League.)

Party	Sep. 1927	Jan. 1932	Change
Cumann na nGaedheal	62	64	▲2
Fianna Fáil	57	56	▼1
Labour	13	10	▼3
Farmers' Party	6	6	Steady
National League	2	—N/a	Steady
Irish Worker League (Note: James Larkin was disqualified due to bankruptcy. In March 1928, the seat was deemed by the Dáil on a vote of 80 to 50 to have been vacant from date of election.)	1	0	▼1
Independent	12	14	▲2
Ceann Comhairle	—N/a	1	▲1
Vacant	—N/a	2	▲2
Total	153		

Cumann na nGaedheal formed the 4th executive council of the Irish Free State, a minority government with Farmers' Party represented as a parliamentary secretary and dependent on the support of independents. After losing a vote on a private member's bill vote due to too many absent members, the 5th executive council was formed in April 1930 with the same composition, with the support of the National League and independents.

=== Graphical representation ===
This is a graphical comparison of party strengths in the 6th Dáil from October 1927. This was not the official seating plan.

== Ceann Comhairle ==
On 11 October 1927, Michael Hayes (CnaG), who had been Ceann Comhairle since 1922, was proposed by W. T. Cosgrave and seconded by Thomas Johnson for the position, and was elected without a vote.

On 27 October 1927, Patrick Hogan (Lab) was proposed by Thomas J. O'Connell and Hugh Colohan as Leas-Cheann Comhairle. He was elected by a vote of 91 to 58. On 8 March 1928, Hogan resigned. On 2 May 1928, Daniel Morrissey (Lab) was elected as Leas-Cheann Comhairle on a vote of 79 to 49.

== TDs by constituency ==
The 153 TDs elected at the September 1927 general election are listed by Dáil constituency.

Members of the 6th Dáil
Constituency	Name	Party
Carlow–Kilkenny	W. T. Cosgrave (Note: W. T. Cosgrave was elected for both Carlow–Kilkenny and Cork Borough. He resigned his seat in Carlow–Kilkenny following the election.)	Cumann na nGaedheal
Carlow–Kilkenny	Peter de Loughry	Cumann na nGaedheal
Carlow–Kilkenny	Edward Doyle	Labour
Carlow–Kilkenny	Thomas Derrig	Fianna Fáil
Carlow–Kilkenny	Richard Holohan	Farmers' Party
Cavan	John James Cole	Independent
Cavan	John O'Hanlon	Independent
Cavan	John Joe O'Reilly	Cumann na nGaedheal
Cavan	Paddy Smith	Fianna Fáil
Clare	Éamon de Valera	Fianna Fáil
Clare	Patrick Hogan	Labour
Clare	Patrick Houlihan	Fianna Fáil
Clare	Patrick Kelly	Cumann na nGaedheal
Clare	Martin Sexton	Fianna Fáil
Cork Borough	Richard Anthony	Labour
Cork Borough	W. T. Cosgrave	Cumann na nGaedheal
Cork Borough	Barry Egan	Cumann na nGaedheal
Cork Borough	Hugo Flinn	Fianna Fáil
Cork Borough	Seán French	Fianna Fáil
Cork East	Edmond Carey	Cumann na nGaedheal
Cork East	Martin Corry	Fianna Fáil
Cork East	John Daly	Cumann na nGaedheal
Cork East	Michael Hennessy	Cumann na nGaedheal
Cork East	William Kent	Fianna Fáil
Cork North	Daniel Corkery	Fianna Fáil
Cork North	Daniel O'Leary	Cumann na nGaedheal
Cork North	Daniel Vaughan	Farmers' Party
Cork West	Thomas Mullins	Fianna Fáil
Cork West	Timothy J. Murphy	Labour
Cork West	Timothy O'Donovan	Farmers' Party
Cork West	Timothy Sheehy	Cumann na nGaedheal
Cork West	Jasper Wolfe	Independent
Donegal	Neal Blaney	Fianna Fáil
Donegal	Frank Carney	Fianna Fáil
Donegal	Archie Cassidy	Labour
Donegal	Eugene Doherty	Cumann na nGaedheal
Donegal	Hugh Law	Cumann na nGaedheal
Donegal	Michael Óg McFadden	Cumann na nGaedheal
Donegal	John White	Farmers' Party
Donegal	James Myles	Independent
Dublin North	Alfie Byrne	Independent
Dublin North	John Byrne	Cumann na nGaedheal
Dublin North	Margaret Collins-O'Driscoll	Cumann na nGaedheal
Dublin North	Eamonn Cooney	Fianna Fáil
Dublin North	James Larkin (Note: James Larkin was disqualified due to bankruptcy. In March 1928, the seat was deemed by the Dáil on a vote of 80 to 50 to have been vacant from date of election.)	Irish Worker League
Dublin North	Patrick Leonard	Cumann na nGaedheal
Dublin North	Richard Mulcahy	Cumann na nGaedheal
Dublin North	Seán T. O'Kelly	Fianna Fáil
Dublin South	James Beckett	Cumann na nGaedheal
Dublin South	Robert Briscoe	Fianna Fáil
Dublin South	Peadar Doyle	Cumann na nGaedheal
Dublin South	Thomas Hennessy	Cumann na nGaedheal
Dublin South	Myles Keogh	Cumann na nGaedheal
Dublin South	Frank Kerlin	Fianna Fáil
Dublin South	Seán Lemass	Fianna Fáil
Dublin County	Seán Brady	Fianna Fáil
Dublin County	Bryan Cooper	Cumann na nGaedheal
Dublin County	Desmond FitzGerald	Cumann na nGaedheal
Dublin County	John Good	Independent
Dublin County	Seán MacEntee	Fianna Fáil
Dublin County	Joseph Murphy	Independent
Dublin County	Batt O'Connor	Cumann na nGaedheal
Dublin County	Gearóid O'Sullivan	Cumann na nGaedheal
Dublin University	Ernest Alton	Independent
Dublin University	James Craig	Independent
Dublin University	William Thrift	Independent
Galway	Seán Broderick	Cumann na nGaedheal
Galway	Frank Fahy	Fianna Fáil
Galway	Patrick Hogan	Cumann na nGaedheal
Galway	Stephen Jordan	Fianna Fáil
Galway	Mark Killilea Snr	Fianna Fáil
Galway	Martin McDonogh	Cumann na nGaedheal
Galway	Joseph Mongan	Cumann na nGaedheal
Galway	Thomas Powell	Fianna Fáil
Galway	Seán Tubridy	Fianna Fáil
Kerry	Frederick Crowley	Fianna Fáil
Kerry	James Crowley	Cumann na nGaedheal
Kerry	Fionán Lynch	Cumann na nGaedheal
Kerry	Tom McEllistrim	Fianna Fáil
Kerry	William O'Leary	Fianna Fáil
Kerry	Thomas O'Reilly	Fianna Fáil
Kerry	John O'Sullivan	Cumann na nGaedheal
Kildare	Hugh Colohan	Labour
Kildare	Domhnall Ua Buachalla	Fianna Fáil
Kildare	George Wolfe	Cumann na nGaedheal
Leitrim–Sligo	James Dolan	Cumann na nGaedheal
Leitrim–Sligo	Frank Carty	Fianna Fáil
Leitrim–Sligo	John Hennigan	Cumann na nGaedheal
Leitrim–Sligo	Samuel Holt	Fianna Fáil
Leitrim–Sligo	Bernard Maguire	Fianna Fáil
Leitrim–Sligo	Patrick Reynolds	Cumann na nGaedheal
Leitrim–Sligo	Martin Roddy	Cumann na nGaedheal
Leix–Offaly	William Aird	Cumann na nGaedheal
Leix–Offaly	Patrick Boland	Fianna Fáil
Leix–Offaly	William Davin	Labour
Leix–Offaly	James Dwyer	Cumann na nGaedheal
Leix–Offaly	Patrick Gorry	Fianna Fáil
Limerick	George C. Bennett	Cumann na nGaedheal
Limerick	Daniel Bourke	Fianna Fáil
Limerick	Patrick Clancy	Labour
Limerick	James Colbert	Fianna Fáil
Limerick	Tadhg Crowley	Fianna Fáil
Limerick	John Nolan	Cumann na nGaedheal
Limerick	Richard O'Connell	Cumann na nGaedheal
Longford–Westmeath	Henry Broderick	Labour
Longford–Westmeath	Michael Connolly	Cumann na nGaedheal
Longford–Westmeath	Michael Kennedy	Fianna Fáil
Longford–Westmeath	James Killane	Fianna Fáil
Longford–Westmeath	Patrick Shaw	Cumann na nGaedheal
Louth	Frank Aiken	Fianna Fáil
Louth	James Coburn	National League
Louth	James Murphy	Cumann na nGaedheal
Mayo North	Micheál Clery	Fianna Fáil
Mayo North	Michael Davis	Cumann na nGaedheal
Mayo North	Mark Henry	Cumann na nGaedheal
Mayo North	P. J. Ruttledge	Fianna Fáil
Mayo South	James FitzGerald-Kenney	Cumann na nGaedheal
Mayo South	Michael Kilroy	Fianna Fáil
Mayo South	Martin Nally	Cumann na nGaedheal
Mayo South	Thomas J. O'Connell	Labour
Mayo South	Richard Walsh	Fianna Fáil
Meath	Eamonn Duggan	Cumann na nGaedheal
Meath	Arthur Matthews	Cumann na nGaedheal
Meath	Matthew O'Reilly	Fianna Fáil
Monaghan	Ernest Blythe	Cumann na nGaedheal
Monaghan	Alexander Haslett	Independent
Monaghan	Conn Ward	Fianna Fáil
National University	Michael Hayes	Cumann na nGaedheal
National University	Patrick McGilligan	Cumann na nGaedheal
National University	Michael Tierney	Cumann na nGaedheal
Roscommon	Gerald Boland	Fianna Fáil
Roscommon	Michael Brennan	Independent
Roscommon	Martin Conlon	Cumann na nGaedheal
Roscommon	Patrick O'Dowd	Fianna Fáil
Tipperary	Séamus Burke	Cumann na nGaedheal
Tipperary	Andrew Fogarty	Fianna Fáil
Tipperary	Seán Hayes	Fianna Fáil
Tipperary	John Hassett	Cumann na nGaedheal
Tipperary	Michael Heffernan	Farmers' Party
Tipperary	Daniel Morrissey	Labour
Tipperary	Timothy Sheehy	Fianna Fáil
Waterford	Seán Goulding	Fianna Fáil
Waterford	Patrick Little	Fianna Fáil
Waterford	William Redmond	National League
Waterford	Vincent White	Cumann na nGaedheal
Wexford	Denis Allen	Fianna Fáil
Wexford	Richard Corish	Labour
Wexford	Osmond Esmonde	Cumann na nGaedheal
Wexford	Michael Jordan	Farmers' Party
Wexford	James Ryan	Fianna Fáil
Wicklow	James Everett	Labour
Wicklow	Séamus Moore	Fianna Fáil
Wicklow	Dermot O'Mahony	Cumann na nGaedheal

== Changes ==
Date	Constituency	Loss	Gain	Note
15 September 1927	Dublin North	Irish Worker League		James Larkin disqualified due to bankruptcy.
11 October 1927	National University	Cumann na nGaedheal	Ceann Comhairle	Michael Hayes takes office as Ceann Comhairle
12 October 1927	Carlow–Kilkenny	Cumann na nGaedheal		W. T. Cosgrave resigns to sit for Cork Borough
3 November 1927	Carlow–Kilkenny		Cumann na nGaedheal	Denis Gorey holds the seat vacated by Cosgrave
3 April 1928	Dublin North		Cumann na nGaedheal	Vincent Rice gains the seat vacated by Larkin
4 December 1928	Dublin North	Independent		Alfie Byrne elected to Seanad Éireann
14 March 1929	Dublin North		Cumann na nGaedheal	Thomas F. O'Higgins gains seat vacated by Byrne
18 April 1929	Leitrim–Sligo	Fianna Fáil		Death of Samuel Holt
26 April 1930	Longford–Westmeath	Fianna Fáil		Death of James Killane
7 June 1929	Leitrim–Sligo		Cumann na nGaedheal	Seán Mac Eoin gains the seat vacated by the death of Holt
13 June 1930	Longford–Westmeath		Fianna Fáil	James Geoghegan holds the seat vacated by the death of Killane
5 July 1930	Dublin County	Cumann na nGaedheal		Death of Bryan Cooper
28 October 1930	Cork West	Fianna Fáil	Independent	Thomas Mullins expelled from the party
9 December 1930	Dublin County		Cumann na nGaedheal	Thomas Finlay holds the seat vacated by the death of Cooper
15 April 1931	Kildare	Labour		Death of Hugh Colohan
29 June 1931	Kildare		Fianna Fáil	Thomas Harris gains the seat vacated by the death of Colohan
July 1931	Waterford	National League	Cumann na nGaedheal	William Redmond joins Cumann na nGaedheal on the disbandment of the National League
July 1931	Louth	National League	Independent	James Coburn becomes an Independent TD on the disbandment of the National League
23 October 1931	Carlow–Kilkenny	Cumann na nGaedheal		Death of Peter de Loughry
24 October 1931	Cork Borough	Labour	Independent	Richard Anthony expelled for voting in favour of the Constitution (Amendment No. 17) Bill
24 October 1931	Tipperary	Labour	Independent	Daniel Morrissey expelled for voting in favour of the Constitution (Amendment No. 17) Bill
31 October 1931	Leix–Offaly	Cumann na nGaedheal		Death of William Aird
17 January 1932	Roscommon	Independent	Cumann na nGaedheal	Michael Brennan selected for Cumann na nGaedheal

== Notes, citations and sources ==
=== External links ===
- "Debates: 6th Dáil". Houses of the Oireachtas.
- "TDs & Senators: 6th Dáil". Houses of the Oireachtas. Archived from the original on 19 January 2021.
