= Leitrim–Sligo =

Dáil constituency (1923–1937)

- Former Dáil constituency

Former constituency
- Created: 1923
- Abolished: 1937
- Seats: 7
- Local government areas: County Leitrim; County Sligo
- Created from: Leitrim–Roscommon North; Sligo–Mayo East
- Replaced by: Leitrim; Sligo

Leitrim–Sligo was a parliamentary constituency represented in Dáil Éireann, the lower house of the Irish parliament or Oireachtas from 1923 to 1937. The constituency elected 7 deputies (Teachtaí Dála, commonly known as TDs) to the Dáil, on the system of proportional representation by means of the single transferable vote (PR-STV).

== History and boundaries ==
The constituency was defined in the Electoral Act 1923 as:

"The administrative counties of Leitrim and Sligo."

This was the first time that the Dáil had not used constituencies defined under British law. Leitrim–Sligo replaced the old Leitrim–Roscommon North and Sligo–Mayo East constituencies, which had been created under the Government of Ireland Act 1920. The constituency was first used at the 1923 general election.

Under the Electoral (Revision of Constituencies) Act 1935, the Leitrim–Sligo constituency was abolished, and replaced for the 1937 general election by two separate 3 seat constituencies: Sligo and Leitrim. The territory was reunited as Sligo–Leitrim under the Electoral (Amendment) Act 1947, in operation from the 1948 general election. The Sligo–Leitrim constituency was abolished at the 2007 general election, and replaced by two new constituencies: Roscommon–South Leitrim and Sligo–North Leitrim.

== TDs ==
Teachtaí Dála (TDs) for Leitrim–Sligo 1923–1937
Key to parties: CnaG = Cumann na nGaedheal; FP = Farmers' Party; FF = Fianna Fáil; FG = Fine Gael; NCP = National Centre Party; NL = National League; Rep = Republican
Dáil	Election	Deputy (Party)	Deputy (Party)	Deputy (Party)	Deputy (Party)	Deputy (Party)	Deputy (Party)	Deputy (Party)
4th	1923	Martin McGowan (Rep)	Frank Carty (Rep)	Thomas Carter (CnaG)	Seán Farrell (Rep)	James Dolan (CnaG)	John Hennigan (CnaG)	Alexander McCabe (CnaG)
4th	1925 by-election	Martin McGowan (Rep)	Frank Carty (Rep)	Samuel Holt (Rep)	Seán Farrell (Rep)	James Dolan (CnaG)	John Hennigan (CnaG)	Martin Roddy (CnaG)
5th	1927 (Jun)	John Jinks (NL)	Frank Carty (FF)	Samuel Holt (FF)	Michael Carter (FP)	James Dolan (CnaG)	John Hennigan (CnaG)	Martin Roddy (CnaG)
6th	1927 (Sep)	Bernard Maguire (FF)	Frank Carty (FF)	Samuel Holt (FF)	Patrick Reynolds (CnaG)	James Dolan (CnaG)	John Hennigan (CnaG)	Martin Roddy (CnaG)
6th	1929 by-election	Bernard Maguire (FF)	Frank Carty (FF)	Seán Mac Eoin (CnaG)	Patrick Reynolds (CnaG)	James Dolan (CnaG)	John Hennigan (CnaG)	Martin Roddy (CnaG)
7th	1932	Bernard Maguire (FF)	Frank Carty (FF)	Stephen Flynn (FF)	Mary Reynolds (CnaG)	William Browne (FF)	John Hennigan (CnaG)	Martin Roddy (CnaG)
8th	1933	Bernard Maguire (FF)	Frank Carty (FF)	Stephen Flynn (FF)	Patrick Rogers (NCP)	William Browne (FF)	James Dolan (CnaG)	Martin Roddy (CnaG)
9th	1937	Constituency abolished. See Sligo and Leitrim						

Note: The columns in this table are used only for presentational purposes, and no significance should be attached to the order of columns. For details of the order in which seats were won at each election, see the detailed results of that election.

== Elections ==
*: Outgoing TD

=== 1933 general election ===
1933 general election: Leitrim–Sligo
Party	Candidate	FPv%	Count							
Party	Candidate	FPv%	1	2	3	4	5	6	7	8
Fianna Fáil	Bernard Maguire	15.5	8,861							
Fianna Fáil	Frank Carty	13.2	7,581							
Cumann na nGaedheal	Martin Roddy	10.8	6,173	6,178	6,185	6,296	6,296	6,318	6,368	7,249
National Centre Party	Patrick Rogers	10.5	6,001	6,011	6,023	6,050	6,050	6,124	6,246	6,785
Fianna Fáil	Stephen Flynn	10.0	5,731	7,204						
Cumann na nGaedheal	James Dolan	8.9	5,114	5,125	5,129	5,164	5,164	5,214	5,284	7,788
Cumann na nGaedheal	John Hennigan	8.1	4,630	4,640	4,642	4,703	4,703	4,802	4,846	5,024
Cumann na nGaedheal	Mary Reynolds	8.0	4,555	4,633	4,634	4,716	4,717	4,738	4,764	
Fianna Fáil	William Browne	7.8	4,492	4,558	4,835	5,263	5,274	8,289		
Fianna Fáil	Andrew Conway	5.6	3,185	3,223	3,343	3,445	3,483			
Labour	Maurice O'Regan	1.6	902	918	922					
Electorate: 72,386 Valid: 57,225 Quota: 7,154 Turnout: 79.1%

=== 1932 general election ===
The vote was delayed two weeks in Leitrim–Sligo due to the assassination of Patrick Reynolds TD two days before the election was to take place. His widow Mary took his place on the ballot and was elected.

1932 general election: Leitrim–Sligo
Party	Candidate	FPv%	Count										
Party	Candidate	FPv%	1	2	3	4	5	6	7	8	9	10	11
Fianna Fáil	Frank Carty	14.8	8,145										
Cumann na nGaedheal	Martin Roddy	13.4	7,382										
Fianna Fáil	Bernard Maguire	13.3	7,356										
Cumann na nGaedheal	Mary Reynolds	9.6	5,317	5,325	5,431	5,454	5,808	6,187	6,902				
Fianna Fáil	Stephen Flynn	9.1	4,988	5,097	5,100	5,453	5,683	5,819	6,324	6,795	7,409		
Cumann na nGaedheal	James Dolan	6.7	3,699	3,717	3,744	3,747	3,804	3,867	4,027	4,080	4,090	4,100	5,173
Fianna Fáil	William Browne	6.3	3,490	4,360	4,375	4,398	4,426	4,926	5,138	7,529			
Cumann na nGaedheal	John Hennigan	6.1	3,378	3,388	3,607	3,610	3,637	3,836	3,903	4,087	4,096	4,103	5,867
Cumann na nGaedheal	Thomas Armstrong	5.9	3,266	3,308	3,393	3,394	3,404	3,612	3,683	3,728	3,735	3,744	
Fianna Fáil	Eugene Gilbride	5.4	2,979	3,122	3,127	3,157	3,191	3,320	3,399				
Independent	Michael Carter	3.6	1,984	2,000	2,007	2,025	2,291	2,367					
Labour	Hugh O'Donnell	3.5	1,934	1,969	1,991	1,994	2,014						
Independent	Andrew Mooney	2.2	1,190	1,195	1,199	1,209							
Electorate: 71,762 Valid: 55,108 Quota: 6,889 Turnout: 76.8%

=== 1929 by-election ===
Following the death of Fianna Fáil TD Samuel Holt on 18 April 1929, a by-election was held on 7 June 1929.

1929 by-election: Leitrim–Sligo
Party	Candidate	FPv%	Count
Party	Candidate	FPv%	1
Cumann na nGaedheal	Seán Mac Eoin	53.7	28,598
Fianna Fáil	Eamon Donnelly	46.3	24,621
Electorate: 72,573 Valid: 53,219 Quota: 26,610 Turnout: 73.3%

=== September 1927 general election ===
September 1927 general election: Leitrim–Sligo
Party	Candidate	FPv%	Count											
Party	Candidate	FPv%	1	2	3	4	5	6	7	8	9	10	11	12
Cumann na nGaedheal	Martin Roddy	15.1	7,829											
Cumann na nGaedheal	James Dolan	10.6	5,500	5,563	5,735	5,753	5,931	6,208	6,605					
Fianna Fáil	Frank Carty	10.0	5,162	5,202	5,233	5,949	6,319	6,445	6,456	6,457	6,615			
Fianna Fáil	Samuel Holt	9.4	4,883	4,890	4,920	4,968	5,117	5,136	5,145	5,145	5,658	5,692	7,631	
Cumann na nGaedheal	Patrick Reynolds	7.6	3,958	3,999	4,045	4,051	4,129	4,211	4,369	4,470	5,929	5,939	5,978	5,988
Fianna Fáil	Bernard Maguire	7.4	3,826	3,830	3,849	3,863	3,982	3,996	4,003	4,003	4,163	4,172	5,011	6,133
Farmers' Party	Michael Carter	6.7	3,479	3,496	3,536	3,563	3,622	3,669	3,693	3,704				
Cumann na nGaedheal	John Hennigan	6.4	3,336	4,023	4,509	4,620	4,898	7,166						
Farmers' Party	Albert Robinson	6.0	3,107	3,255	3,400	3,427	3,533	3,745	3,819	3,829	4,407	4,418	4,502	4,519
Cumann na nGaedheal	James Gilligan	5.7	2,948	3,144	3,239	3,274	3,391							
Fianna Fáil	William Browne	4.9	2,550	2,558	2,641	3,122	3,855	3,875	3,879	3,879	3,989	4,005		
Labour	Archie Heron	4.2	2,163	2,209	2,506	2,551								
Fianna Fáil	Edward Hannon	3.1	1,601	1,622	1,637									
Independent	John Jinks	2.9	1,506	1,575										
Electorate: 72,640 Valid: 51,848 Quota: 6,482 Turnout: 71.4%

=== June 1927 general election ===
June 1927 general election: Leitrim–Sligo
Party	Candidate	FPv%	Count														
Party	Candidate	FPv%	1	2	3	4	5	6	7	8	9	10	11	12	13	14	15
Cumann na nGaedheal	Martin Roddy	15.4	7,677														
Fianna Fáil	Frank Carty	10.0	4,958	4,995	5,057	5,120	6,331										
Cumann na nGaedheal	James Dolan	8.8	4,383	4,433	4,448	4,632	4,649	5,346	5,494	5,602	5,602	5,797	6,929				
Farmers' Party	Michael Carter	8.2	4,081	4,097	4,107	4,204	4,238	4,609	4,638	4,716	4,716	4,798	5,614	5,688	5,739	7,456	
Sinn Féin	Seán Farrell	6.9	3,455	3,457	3,467	3,502	3,622	3,666	3,683	3,790	3,798	3,940	4,049	4,063	4,067	4,095	4,116
Farmers' Party	Albert Robinson	5.9	2,956	3,105	3,143	3,251	3,276	3,337	3,492	3,520	3,521	3,641	3,717	3,737	3,751		
Cumann na nGaedheal	John Hennigan	5.9	2,943	3,628	3,684	3,814	3,911	4,043	5,473	5,494	5,495	5,792	6,023	6,587			
Cumann na nGaedheal	Patrick Briody	4.9	2,434	2,447	2,453	2,460	2,461	2,744	2,871	2,881	2,881	2,990					
Fianna Fáil	Bernard Maguire	4.8	2,398	2,403	2,413	2,511	2,542	2,571	2,584								
Fianna Fáil	Samuel Holt	4.8	2,384	2,394	2,408	2,467	2,560	2,645	2,696	4,585	4,672	4,986	5,077	5,093	5,097	5,204	5,303
National League	John Jinks	4.5	2,224	2,301	2,410	2,533	2,604	2,653	2,729	2,808	2,810	3,790	3,852	3,866	3,890	4,367	4,625
Labour	Archie Heron	4.4	2,171	2,227	2,285	2,417	2,485	2,571	2,691	2,765	2,770						
Cumann na nGaedheal	James Gilligan	4.3	2,154	2,323	2,340	2,364	2,395	2,442									
Cumann na nGaedheal	Andrew Mooney	3.9	1,939	2,059	2,081	2,115	2,121										
Fianna Fáil	Eugene Gilbride	3.6	1,770	1,777	1,821	1,895											
Independent	James McGowan	2.7	1,359	1,386	1,401												
Clann Éireann	William J. Tolan	1.1	523	550													
Electorate: 72,640 Valid: 49,809 Quota: 6,227 Turnout: 68.6%

=== 1925 by-election ===
On 11 March 1925, a "mini general election" was held comprising by-elections in seven constituencies, including one for two vacancies in Leitrim–Sligo. The vacancies were caused by the resignations on 30 October 1924 of nine TDs who had left Cumann na nGaedheal to form the National Group in protest at the handling of the Army Mutiny. The two who resigned in Leitrim–Sligo were Thomas Carter and Alexander McCabe, neither of whom stood for re-election.

1925 by-election: Leitrim–Sligo
Party	Candidate	FPv%	Count	
Party	Candidate	FPv%	1	2
Cumann na nGaedheal	Martin Roddy	32.9	16,332	16,868
Cumann na nGaedheal	Andrew Mooney	28.3	14,054	14,343
Republican	Samuel Holt	20.3	10,062	18,287
Republican	Frank O'Beirne	18.6	9,232	
Electorate: 79,234 Valid: 49,680 Quota: 16,561 Turnout: 62.7%

=== 1923 general election ===
1923 general election: Leitrim–Sligo
Party	Candidate	FPv%	Count													
Party	Candidate	FPv%	1	2	3	4	5	6	7	8	9	10	11	12	13	14
Cumann na nGaedheal	Alexander McCabe	17.7	8,087													
Cumann na nGaedheal	James Dolan	12.2	5,556	5,721												
Republican	Frank Carty	11.4	5,197	5,251	5,337	5,352	5,375	5,416	5,459	5,515	5,559	5,562	5,856			
Republican	Seán Farrell	11.0	5,014	5,020	5,029	5,094	5,154	5,206	5,212	5,382	5,395	5,395	5,511	5,538	5,550	5,576
Cumann na nGaedheal	Thomas Carter	9.9	4,505	4,668	4,674	4,821	4,907	5,081	5,253	5,571	5,899					
Republican	Martin McGowan	8.2	3,756	3,796	3,816	3,826	3,834	3,855	3,871	3,898	3,928	3,930	4,082	4,099	4,154	4,200
Cumann na nGaedheal	John Hennigan	5.3	2,431	2,914	2,918	2,933	3,063	3,103	3,406	3,451	4,077	4,223	4,417	4,423	4,949	6,352
Republican	Liam Pilkington	4.6	2,089	2,105	2,311	2,324	2,361	2,365	2,389	2,433	2,477	2,479	2,890	2,980	3,012	3,154
Farmers' Party	Martin Roddy	3.2	1,470	1,590	1,598	1,601	1,622	1,643	1,713	1,837	1,942	1,958	2,039	2,045	2,946	
Labour	John Lynch	3.2	1,470	1,528	1,539	1,548	1,650	1,674	1,714	1,733	1,791	1,795				
Farmers' Party	James Gilligan	2.8	1,286	1,479	1,483	1,487	1,530	1,557	1,699	1,767	1,871	1,891	1,947	1,951		
Farmers' Party	James O'Rourke	2.0	901	907	912	1,112	1,114	1,365	1,391							
Independent	Laurence Hayden	1.6	745	752	755	829	841									
Cumann na nGaedheal	Jeremiah O'Connell	1.6	740	1,093	1,115	1,118	1,278	1,298	1,561	1,595						
Independent	Henry Depew	1.6	735	784	790	792										
Farmers' Party	Patrick O'Neill	1.5	679	685	694											
Cumann na nGaedheal	Thomas O'Donnell	1.2	562	1,208	1,218	1,227	1,259	1,277								
Republican	Denis Mulcahy	0.9	423	439												
Electorate: 81,432 Valid: 45,646 Quota: 5,706 Turnout: 56.1%

== See also ==
- Politics of the Republic of Ireland
- Historic Dáil constituencies
- Elections in the Republic of Ireland
