= Michael Carter (Irish politician) =

Irish politician and farmer (died 1954)

Teachta Dála
- In office June 1927 – September 1927
- Constituency: Leitrim–Sligo

Personal details
- Died: November 1954
- Party: Farmers' Party

Michael Carter (died November 1954) was an Irish politician and farmer. He was first elected to Dáil Éireann at the June 1927 general election as a Farmers' Party Teachta Dála (TD) for the Leitrim–Sligo constituency. He lost his seat at the September 1927 general election. He stood as an independent candidate at the 1932 general election but was not elected.

Carter was an auctioneer and valuer and was also involved in the Ancient Order of Hibernians, once holding the position of Leitrim county president.

He was elected to Leitrim County Council in 1911, and from 1926 to 1934, he was chairman of the council.

He died at Ruskey, Carrick-on-Shannon, County Leitrim, in November 1954, at "over 80 years of age".

Dáil	Election	Deputy (Party)	Deputy (Party)	Deputy (Party)	Deputy (Party)	Deputy (Party)	Deputy (Party)	Deputy (Party)
4th	1923	Martin McGowan (Rep)	Frank Carty (Rep)	Thomas Carter (CnaG)	Seán Farrell (Rep)	James Dolan (CnaG)	John Hennigan (CnaG)	Alexander McCabe (CnaG)
4th	1925 by-election	Martin McGowan (Rep)	Frank Carty (Rep)	Samuel Holt (Rep)	Seán Farrell (Rep)	James Dolan (CnaG)	John Hennigan (CnaG)	Martin Roddy (CnaG)
5th	1927 (Jun)	John Jinks (NL)	Frank Carty (FF)	Samuel Holt (FF)	Michael Carter (FP)	James Dolan (CnaG)	John Hennigan (CnaG)	Martin Roddy (CnaG)
6th	1927 (Sep)	Bernard Maguire (FF)	Frank Carty (FF)	Samuel Holt (FF)	Patrick Reynolds (CnaG)	James Dolan (CnaG)	John Hennigan (CnaG)	Martin Roddy (CnaG)
6th	1929 by-election	Bernard Maguire (FF)	Frank Carty (FF)	Seán Mac Eoin (CnaG)	Patrick Reynolds (CnaG)	James Dolan (CnaG)	John Hennigan (CnaG)	Martin Roddy (CnaG)
7th	1932	Bernard Maguire (FF)	Frank Carty (FF)	Stephen Flynn (FF)	Mary Reynolds (CnaG)	William Browne (FF)	John Hennigan (CnaG)	Martin Roddy (CnaG)
8th	1933	Bernard Maguire (FF)	Frank Carty (FF)	Stephen Flynn (FF)	Patrick Rogers (NCP)	William Browne (FF)	James Dolan (CnaG)	Martin Roddy (CnaG)
9th	1937	Constituency abolished. See Sligo and Leitrim						
