= Andrew Lavin =

Irish politician

Teachta Dála
- In office August 1923 – June 1927
- Constituency: Roscommon
- In office May 1921 – August 1923
- Constituency: Leitrim–Roscommon North

Personal details
- Born: 1891
- Died: 26 March 1959 (aged 67–68)
- Party: Sinn Féin; Cumann na nGaedheal

Military intelligence file for Andrew Lavin

Andrew Lavin (c. 1891 – 26 March 1959) was an Irish politician and farmer.

During the Irish War of Independence, Lavin was attached to North Roscommon Brigade, Irish Republican Army and took part in the destruction of an RIC barracks, attacks on British forces and the manufacture of munitions. He also claims to have been a member of the Supreme Council of the Irish Republican Brotherhood during 1919 and 1920.

He was elected unopposed as a Sinn Féin Teachta Dála (TD) to the Second Dáil at the 1921 elections for the Leitrim–Roscommon North constituency. He supported the Anglo-Irish Treaty and voted in favour of it. He was elected as a pro-Treaty Sinn Féin TD at the 1922 general election. Joining the National Army in June 1922, he resigned from the Defence Forces in August 1923 while serving at the rank of Captain to stand as a Cumann na nGaedheal candidate in the Roscommon constituency at the 1923 general election. Lavin lost his seat at the June 1927 general election, and was also an unsuccessful candidate at the September 1927 general election.

Lavin, of 20 The Rise, Glasnevin, County Dublin, died aged 79 on 26 March 1959.

Dáil	Election	Deputy (Party)	Deputy (Party)	Deputy (Party)	Deputy (Party)
2nd	1921	Thomas Carter (SF)	James Dolan (SF)	Andrew Lavin (SF)	George Noble Plunkett (SF)
3rd	1922	Thomas Carter (PT-SF)	James Dolan (PT-SF)	Andrew Lavin (PT-SF)	George Noble Plunkett (AT-SF)
4th	1923	Constituency abolished. See Leitrim–Sligo and Roscommon			

Dáil	Election	Deputy (Party)	Deputy (Party)	Deputy (Party)	Deputy (Party)
4th	1923	George Noble Plunkett (Rep)	Henry Finlay (CnaG)	Gerald Boland (Rep)	Andrew Lavin (CnaG)
4th	1925 by-election	George Noble Plunkett (Rep)	Martin Conlon (CnaG)	Gerald Boland (Rep)	Andrew Lavin (CnaG)
5th	1927 (Jun)	Patrick O'Dowd (FF)	Martin Conlon (CnaG)	Gerald Boland (FF)	Michael Brennan (Ind.)
6th	1927 (Sep)	Patrick O'Dowd (FF)	Martin Conlon (CnaG)	Gerald Boland (FF)	Michael Brennan (Ind.)
7th	1932	Daniel O'Rourke (FF)	Martin Conlon (CnaG)	Gerald Boland (FF)	Frank MacDermot (NCP)
8th	1933	Patrick O'Dowd (FF)	Michael Brennan (CnaG)	Gerald Boland (FF)	Frank MacDermot (NCP)
9th	1937	Michael Brennan (FG)	Daniel O'Rourke (FF)	Gerald Boland (FF)	3 seats 1937–1948
10th	1938	Michael Brennan (FG)	Daniel O'Rourke (FF)	Gerald Boland (FF)	3 seats 1937–1948
11th	1943	John Meighan (CnaT)	John Beirne (CnaT)	Gerald Boland (FF)	3 seats 1937–1948
12th	1944	Daniel O'Rourke (FF)	John Beirne (CnaT)	Gerald Boland (FF)	3 seats 1937–1948
13th	1948	Daniel O'Rourke (FF)	John Beirne (CnaT)	Gerald Boland (FF)	Jack McQuillan (CnaP)
14th	1951	John Finan (CnaT)	John Beirne (CnaT)	Gerald Boland (FF)	Jack McQuillan (Ind.)
15th	1954	James Burke (FG)	John Beirne (CnaT)	Gerald Boland (FF)	Jack McQuillan (Ind.)
16th	1957	James Burke (FG)	John Beirne (CnaT)	Gerald Boland (FF)	Jack McQuillan (Ind.)
17th	1961	James Burke (FG)	Patrick J. Reynolds (FG)	Brian Lenihan Snr (FF)	Jack McQuillan (NPD)
17th	1964 by-election	Joan Burke (FG)	Patrick J. Reynolds (FG)	Brian Lenihan Snr (FF)	Jack McQuillan (NPD)
18th	1965	Joan Burke (FG)	Patrick J. Reynolds (FG)	Brian Lenihan Snr (FF)	Hugh Gibbons (FF)
19th	1969	Constituency abolished. See Roscommon–Leitrim			

Dáil	Election	Deputy (Party)	Deputy (Party)	Deputy (Party)
22nd	1981	Terry Leyden (FF)	Seán Doherty (FF)	John Connor (FG)
23rd	1982 (Feb)	Terry Leyden (FF)	Seán Doherty (FF)	Liam Naughten (FG)
24th	1982 (Nov)	Terry Leyden (FF)	Seán Doherty (FF)	Liam Naughten (FG)
25th	1987	Terry Leyden (FF)	Seán Doherty (FF)	Liam Naughten (FG)
26th	1989	Terry Leyden (FF)	Tom Foxe (Ind.)	John Connor (FG)
27th	1992	Constituency abolished. See Longford–Roscommon		
