= 1927 Irish general election =

Two general elections were held in Ireland in 1927:

- June 1927 Irish general election
- September 1927 Irish general election
