= John Hennigan =

John Hennigan may refer to:

- John Morrison (wrestler) (born 1979), American professional wrestler and actor born John Hennigan
- John Hennigan (poker player) (born 1970), American professional poker player
- John Hennigan (politician), Irish Cumann na nGaedhael politician
