= Frank O'Beirne =

Irish politician and businessman (1898–1978)

Senator
- In office 8 September 1943 – 18 August 1944
- Constituency: Industrial and Commercial Panel

Personal details
- Born: John Francis O'Beirne; 1897 County Sligo, Ireland
- Died: 7 February 1978 (aged 80–81) County Kildare, Ireland
- Party: Fianna Fáil; Sinn Féin
- Spouse: Kathleen O'Beirne

John Francis O'Beirne (1897 – 7 February 1978) was a farmer, businessman, Irish republican activist and Fianna Fáil politician in County Sligo. He served in Seanad Éireann from 1943 to 1944.

== War of Independence ==
O'Beirne grew up in Collooney, and was an early supporter of Sinn Féin. He was arrested in February 1918 for unlawful assembly relating to commandeering of land for "conacre". He refused to post bail and was sentenced to six months' imprisonment. In February 1919, he was arrested for illegal fundraising in Collooney, again refused to post bail, and served three months. In June, he organised an aeraíocht (outdoor cultural festival) in Collooney.

The Irish War of Independence was escalating, and O'Beirne was Officer Commanding of the Collooney Battalion of the Irish Republican Army (the "Old IRA"). After the local elections of May 1920, O'Beirne was chairman of Sligo rural district council (RDC), leading the council to accept the authority of the First Dáil. As RDC chairman, he was ex officio a member of County Sligo county council, which passed a similar resolution when it met in June. When Major Bryan Cooper refused to pay the "IRA rates", O'Beirne took two bullocks in lieu. On 26 June, he helped to spring Frank Carty from Sligo Gaol. In July, he was an adjudicator at the Dáil Courts which sat at Sooey Creamery and later at Sligo Courthouse.

O'Beirne sometimes used Major Heather's Knockadoo House near Coolaney as a safehouse. He led a raid on the British Army barracks in Carrick-on-Shannon. He did not participate in a raid on Collooney RIC barracks in March 1921 as he was sick. He was captured on 27 May 1921 and court-martialled for involvement in the killing of RIC constables in Ballisodare, but escaped from Sligo Gaol in June 1921 before sentence could be passed.

== Anti-treaty activity ==
O'Beirne was a close friend of Éamon de Valera, and took the anti-Treaty side in the Irish Civil War. His Collooney Battalion, now part of the "Irregulars", killed five Irish Free State Army soldiers in an ambush and captured two armoured cars. Soon after he was taken prisoner along with forty men after Seán Mac Eoin launched a surprise attack on the town.

In the 1925 Leitrim–Sligo by-election two vacancies in Leitrim–Sligo were to be filled; O'Beirne stood for Sinn Féin along with Samuel Holt. Holt received slightly more first preferences than O'Beirne and was elected with his transfers, along with Martin Roddy of Cumann na nGaedheal. In his concession speech, O'Beirne said there were "two things he held narrow views on; one was pride in his Catholic Faith, and the other was his pride in his Irish Nationality. [...] priests and bishops [...] were not infallible as far as politics were concerned."

The following November, O'Beirne was one of two men convicted in the Central Criminal Court for 'being concerned in the organisation of an illegal organisation "The Irish Republican Army"'. The jury suggested the men should not be treated as criminals, while the judge said their fundamental crime was treason, which at the time was punishable by death. In the event, a 12-month sentence was imposed.

== Fianna Fáil ==
O'Beirne spent time in the United States, "reporting" to the New York IRA co-ordinator Connie Neenan in January 1927, and attended prominent Clan na Gael functions in 1930–1932. Moss Twomey, the IRA chief of staff, had a low opinion of O'Beirne. Officially he worked as a shipping agent, which was a front for acting illegally as an agent for the Irish Sweepstakes. He returned to Ireland in the 1930s, working as a farmer and businessman, and was active in Fianna Fáil's industrial policy promoted by Seán Lemass. He was elected to the Seanad in 1943 on the Industrial and Commercial Panel, but was defeated in the 1944 Seanad election, having also failed to be elected to the Dáil for Sligo at the 1944 general election.

O'Beirne was director of several companies, including Meat Exporters (Sligo) Ltd, and Flemings Fireclays. He was a founding director of the Sligo Industrial Development Corporation in 1953. In 1955, he bought from Major Clarence H. Hillas "Sea View", a country house previously owned by the Atkinson family, near the Sligo–Ballina road at Doonecoy, Templeboy. He was a member of the Racing Board from 1965 to 1970. He was killed in a car crash on the N7 near Kill, County Kildare, aged 81. His wife Kathleen had died in 1969.
