= Seán Farrell =

Irish politician (died 1972)

Teachta Dála
- In office August 1923 – June 1927
- Constituency: Leitrim–Sligo

Personal details
- Died: 1 August 1972
- Party: Sinn Féin

Seán Farrell (died 1 August 1972) was an Irish politician and teacher. He was first elected to Dáil Éireann as a Sinn Féin Teachta Dála (TD) for the Leitrim–Sligo constituency at the 1923 general election.

He did not take his seat in the Dáil due to Sinn Féin's abstentionist policy. He lost his seat at the June 1927 general election.

Dáil	Election	Deputy (Party)	Deputy (Party)	Deputy (Party)	Deputy (Party)	Deputy (Party)	Deputy (Party)	Deputy (Party)
4th	1923	Martin McGowan (Rep)	Frank Carty (Rep)	Thomas Carter (CnaG)	Seán Farrell (Rep)	James Dolan (CnaG)	John Hennigan (CnaG)	Alexander McCabe (CnaG)
4th	1925 by-election	Martin McGowan (Rep)	Frank Carty (Rep)	Samuel Holt (Rep)	Seán Farrell (Rep)	James Dolan (CnaG)	John Hennigan (CnaG)	Martin Roddy (CnaG)
5th	1927 (Jun)	John Jinks (NL)	Frank Carty (FF)	Samuel Holt (FF)	Michael Carter (FP)	James Dolan (CnaG)	John Hennigan (CnaG)	Martin Roddy (CnaG)
6th	1927 (Sep)	Bernard Maguire (FF)	Frank Carty (FF)	Samuel Holt (FF)	Patrick Reynolds (CnaG)	James Dolan (CnaG)	John Hennigan (CnaG)	Martin Roddy (CnaG)
6th	1929 by-election	Bernard Maguire (FF)	Frank Carty (FF)	Seán Mac Eoin (CnaG)	Patrick Reynolds (CnaG)	James Dolan (CnaG)	John Hennigan (CnaG)	Martin Roddy (CnaG)
7th	1932	Bernard Maguire (FF)	Frank Carty (FF)	Stephen Flynn (FF)	Mary Reynolds (CnaG)	William Browne (FF)	John Hennigan (CnaG)	Martin Roddy (CnaG)
8th	1933	Bernard Maguire (FF)	Frank Carty (FF)	Stephen Flynn (FF)	Patrick Rogers (NCP)	William Browne (FF)	James Dolan (CnaG)	Martin Roddy (CnaG)
9th	1937	Constituency abolished. See Sligo and Leitrim						
