= Leitrim–Roscommon North =

Dáil constituency (1921–1923)

- Former Dáil constituency
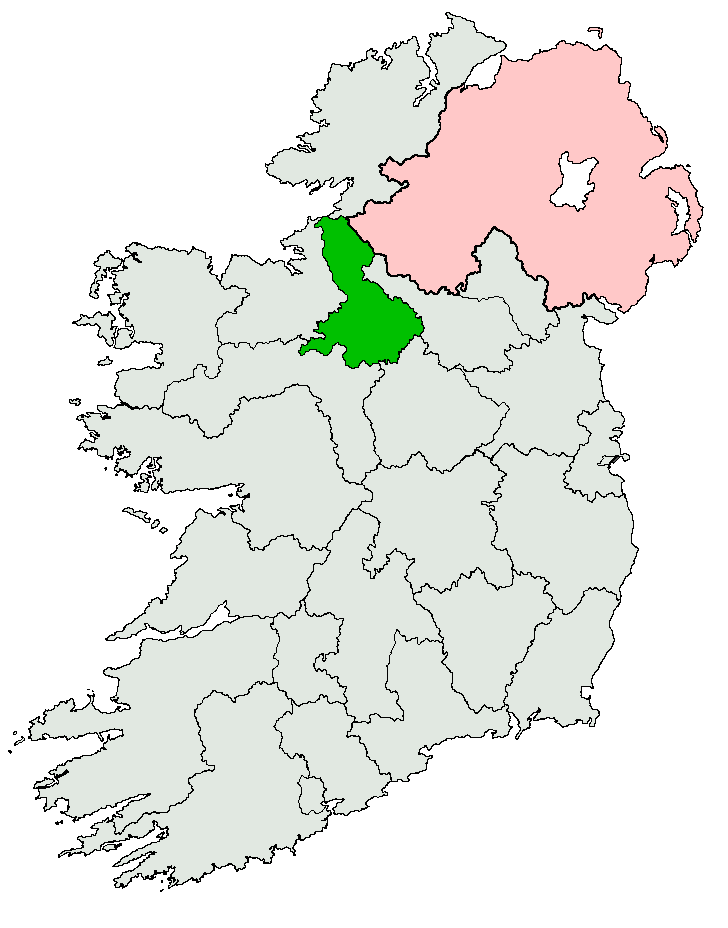
- Location of Leitrim–Roscommon North within Ireland

Former constituency
- Created: 1921
- Abolished: 1923
- Seats: 4
- Local government areas: County Leitrim; County Roscommon
- Created from: County Leitrim; North Roscommon
- Replaced by: Leitrim–Sligo; Roscommon

Leitrim–Roscommon North was a parliamentary constituency represented in Dáil Éireann, the lower house of the Irish parliament or Oireachtas from 1921 to 1923. The constituency elected 4 deputies (Teachtaí Dála, commonly known as TDs) to the Dáil, on the system of proportional representation by means of the single transferable vote (PR-STV).

== History and boundaries ==
The constituency was created in 1921, under the Government of Ireland Act 1920, for the 1921 general election to the House of Commons of Southern Ireland, whose members formed the Second Dáil. It was used again for the 1922 general election to the 3rd Dáil

Leitrim–Roscommon North was abolished under the Electoral Act 1923, and replaced by the two new constituencies of Leitrim–Sligo and Roscommon.

It covered all of County Leitrim and part of County Roscommon.

== TDs ==
Teachtaí Dála (TDs) for Leitrim–Roscommon North 1921–1923
Key to parties: SF = Sinn Féin; AT-SF = Sinn Féin (Anti-Treaty); PT-SF = Sinn Féin (Pro-Treaty)
Dáil	Election	Deputy (Party)	Deputy (Party)	Deputy (Party)	Deputy (Party)
2nd	1921	Thomas Carter (SF)	James Dolan (SF)	Andrew Lavin (SF)	George Noble Plunkett (SF)
3rd	1922	Thomas Carter (PT-SF)	James Dolan (PT-SF)	Andrew Lavin (PT-SF)	George Noble Plunkett (AT-SF)
4th	1923	Constituency abolished. See Leitrim–Sligo and Roscommon			

Note: The columns in this table are used only for presentational purposes, and no significance should be attached to the order of columns. For details of the order in which seats were won at each election, see the detailed results of that election.

== Elections ==
*: Outgoing TD

=== 1922 general election ===
1922 general election: Leitrim–Roscommon North (uncontested)
Party	Candidate
Sinn Féin (Pro-Treaty)	Thomas Carter
Sinn Féin (Pro-Treaty)	James Dolan
Sinn Féin (Pro-Treaty)	Andrew Lavin
Sinn Féin (Anti-Treaty)	George Noble Plunkett
Electorate: 44,911

=== 1921 general election ===
1921 general election: Leitrim–Roscommon North (uncontested)
Party	Candidate
Sinn Féin	Thomas Carter
Sinn Féin	James Dolan
Sinn Féin	Andrew Lavin
Sinn Féin	George Noble Plunkett

== See also ==
- Dáil constituencies
- Politics of the Republic of Ireland
- Historic Dáil constituencies
- Elections in the Republic of Ireland
