= Martin McGowan (Irish politician) =

Irish politician (1890–1958)

Teachta Dála
- In office August 1923 – June 1927
- Constituency: Leitrim–Sligo

Personal details
- Born: 7 November 1890 Ballyshannon, County Leitrim, Ireland
- Died: 14 June 1958 (aged 67) County Leitrim, Ireland
- Party: Sinn Féin
- Other political affiliations: Clann na Poblachta
- Spouse: Mary McGowan (m. 1929)
- Children: 7
- Education: St Patrick's College, Dublin

Military service
- Branch/service: Irish Volunteers; Irish Republican Army; Anti-Treaty IRA

Martin Bernard McGowan (7 November 1890 – 14 June 1958) was an Irish politician and teacher.

He was born in Aghamore, Ballyshannon, County Leitrim, to parents James McGowan, national school principal, and Margaret Jane McGowan (née Gallagher). He was educated locally before going to St Patrick's College, Dublin, to train as a primary schoolteacher. He returned to Leitrim after graduation and succeeded his father as principal of Drummons national school.

He was involved with Conradh na Gaeilge and the GAA, and was influenced by fellow Leitrim man Seán Mac Diarmada. In 1914 he joined the Irish Volunteers and became heavily involved with the organisation and training of Volunteer companies throughout the county. Although he did not take part in the 1916 Easter Rising, the execution of his friend Mac Diarmada had a profound impact on him.

During the Irish War of Independence he rose to become commanding officer of the Leitrim brigade of the Irish Republican Army and went on the run in 1920. Leitrim was not particularly active during the 1919–1921 period but his small column, based in the north of the county, was involved in several engagements in collaboration with the more active columns in Sligo, most notably the ambush at Moneygold on 25 October 1920.

He opposed the Anglo-Irish Treaty and was active in the Sligo–Leitrim border area during the Irish Civil War with the Anti-Treaty IRA.

He was first elected to Dáil Éireann as an anti-Treaty Sinn Féin Teachta Dála (TD) for Leitrim–Sligo at the 1923 general election. He did not take his seat in the Dáil due to Sinn Féin's abstentionist policy. He was disappointed by the decision of Éamon de Valera to enter the Dáil in 1926, and never joined Fianna Fáil. He did not contest the June 1927 general election.

He joined Clann na Poblachta on its founding in 1946, and served on its national executive. In 1950 he was elected to Leitrim County Council as a Clann na Poblachta candidate and was re-elected in 1955. He stood as a Clann na Poblachta candidate at the 1951 and 1954 general elections for Sligo–Leitrim but was not elected.

He married Mary McGowan in June 1929; and they had seven sons. He died on 14 June 1958.

Dáil	Election	Deputy (Party)	Deputy (Party)	Deputy (Party)	Deputy (Party)	Deputy (Party)	Deputy (Party)	Deputy (Party)
4th	1923	Martin McGowan (Rep)	Frank Carty (Rep)	Thomas Carter (CnaG)	Seán Farrell (Rep)	James Dolan (CnaG)	John Hennigan (CnaG)	Alexander McCabe (CnaG)
4th	1925 by-election	Martin McGowan (Rep)	Frank Carty (Rep)	Samuel Holt (Rep)	Seán Farrell (Rep)	James Dolan (CnaG)	John Hennigan (CnaG)	Martin Roddy (CnaG)
5th	1927 (Jun)	John Jinks (NL)	Frank Carty (FF)	Samuel Holt (FF)	Michael Carter (FP)	James Dolan (CnaG)	John Hennigan (CnaG)	Martin Roddy (CnaG)
6th	1927 (Sep)	Bernard Maguire (FF)	Frank Carty (FF)	Samuel Holt (FF)	Patrick Reynolds (CnaG)	James Dolan (CnaG)	John Hennigan (CnaG)	Martin Roddy (CnaG)
6th	1929 by-election	Bernard Maguire (FF)	Frank Carty (FF)	Seán Mac Eoin (CnaG)	Patrick Reynolds (CnaG)	James Dolan (CnaG)	John Hennigan (CnaG)	Martin Roddy (CnaG)
7th	1932	Bernard Maguire (FF)	Frank Carty (FF)	Stephen Flynn (FF)	Mary Reynolds (CnaG)	William Browne (FF)	John Hennigan (CnaG)	Martin Roddy (CnaG)
8th	1933	Bernard Maguire (FF)	Frank Carty (FF)	Stephen Flynn (FF)	Patrick Rogers (NCP)	William Browne (FF)	James Dolan (CnaG)	Martin Roddy (CnaG)
9th	1937	Constituency abolished. See Sligo and Leitrim						
