= 1929 Leitrim–Sligo by-election =

By-election to the 6th Dáil

- 7 June 1929
- Turnout: 53,219 (73.3%)
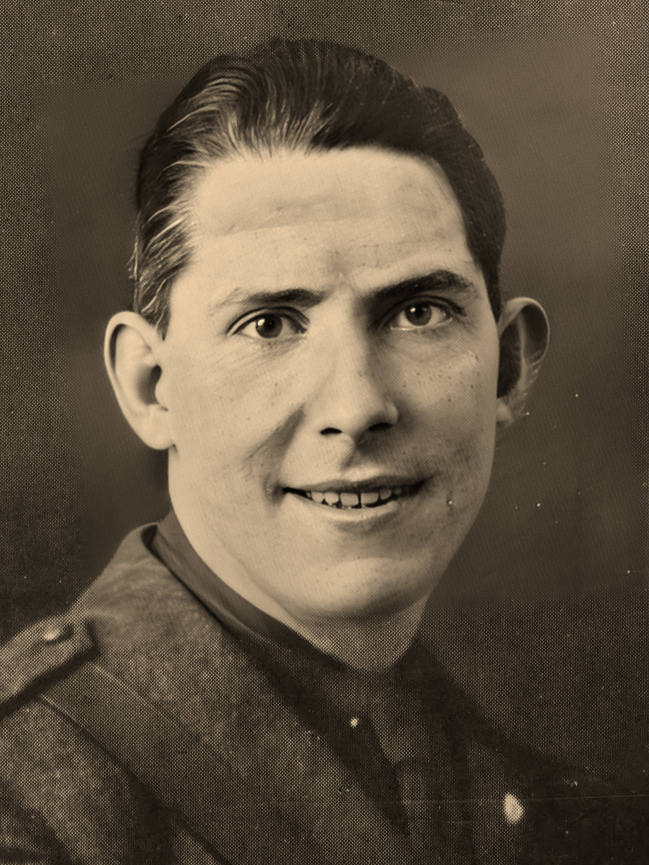
		Donnelly
Nominee	Seán Mac Eoin	Eamon Donnelly
Party	Cumann na nGaedheal	Fianna Fáil
First preferences	28,598	24,621
Percentage	53.7%	46.3%
TD before election
Samuel Holt
Fianna Fáil
TD after election
Seán Mac Eoin
Cumann na nGaedheal

A Dáil by-election was held in the constituency of Leitrim–Sligo in the Irish Free State on Friday, 7 June 1929, to fill a vacancy in the 6th Dáil. It followed the death of Fianna Fáil TD Samuel Holt on 18 April 1929.

In 1929, Leitrim–Sligo was a seven-seat constituency comprising County Leitrim and County Sligo.

The writ of election to fill the vacancy was agreed by the Dáil on 15 May 1929. The by-election was won by the Cumann na nGaedheal candidate Seán Mac Eoin.

== Result ==
1929 Leitrim–Sligo by-election
Party	Candidate	FPv%	Count
Party	Candidate	FPv%	1
Cumann na nGaedheal	Seán Mac Eoin	53.7	28,598
Fianna Fáil	Eamon Donnelly	46.3	24,621
Electorate: 72,573 Valid: 53,219 Quota: 26,610 Turnout: 73.3%
