= Thomas Carter (TD) =

Irish politician (1882–1951)

Teachta Dála
- In office February 1948 – May 1951
- Constituency: Longford–Westmeath
- In office June 1943 – February 1948
- Constituency: Athlone–Longford
- In office August 1923 – 30 October 1924
- Constituency: Leitrim–Sligo
- In office May 1921 – August 1923
- Constituency: Leitrim–Roscommon North

Personal details
- Born: 29 March 1882
- Died: 11 September 1951 (aged 69)
- Party: Sinn Féin; Cumann na nGaedheal; Fianna Fáil

Thomas Carter (29 March 1882 – 11 September 1951) was an Irish politician whose career spanned two different time periods and political parties.

A shopkeeper, he was elected unopposed as a Sinn Féin Teachta Dála (TD) to the Second Dáil at the 1921 general election for the Leitrim–Roscommon North constituency. He supported the Anglo-Irish Treaty and voted in favour of it. He was re-elected unopposed as a pro-Treaty Sinn Féin TD at the 1922 general election. He was re-elected as a Cumann na nGaedheal TD for the Leitrim–Sligo constituency at the 1923 general election. He resigned on 30 October 1924 along with seven other TDs in opposition to the Government's actions to the so-called Irish Army Mutiny. The subsequent by-election held on 11 March 1925 was won by Samuel Holt of Sinn Féin.

Carter returned to politics when he was elected as a Fianna Fáil TD for the Athlone–Longford constituency at the 1943 general election. He was re-elected as a Fianna Fáil TD at the 1944 general election, and after constituency boundary changes he was elected for Longford–Westmeath at the 1948 general election. He retired from politics at the 1951 general election.

Dáil	Election	Deputy (Party)	Deputy (Party)	Deputy (Party)	Deputy (Party)
2nd	1921	Thomas Carter (SF)	James Dolan (SF)	Andrew Lavin (SF)	George Noble Plunkett (SF)
3rd	1922	Thomas Carter (PT-SF)	James Dolan (PT-SF)	Andrew Lavin (PT-SF)	George Noble Plunkett (AT-SF)
4th	1923	Constituency abolished. See Leitrim–Sligo and Roscommon			

Dáil	Election	Deputy (Party)	Deputy (Party)	Deputy (Party)	Deputy (Party)	Deputy (Party)	Deputy (Party)	Deputy (Party)
4th	1923	Martin McGowan (Rep)	Frank Carty (Rep)	Thomas Carter (CnaG)	Seán Farrell (Rep)	James Dolan (CnaG)	John Hennigan (CnaG)	Alexander McCabe (CnaG)
4th	1925 by-election	Martin McGowan (Rep)	Frank Carty (Rep)	Samuel Holt (Rep)	Seán Farrell (Rep)	James Dolan (CnaG)	John Hennigan (CnaG)	Martin Roddy (CnaG)
5th	1927 (Jun)	John Jinks (NL)	Frank Carty (FF)	Samuel Holt (FF)	Michael Carter (FP)	James Dolan (CnaG)	John Hennigan (CnaG)	Martin Roddy (CnaG)
6th	1927 (Sep)	Bernard Maguire (FF)	Frank Carty (FF)	Samuel Holt (FF)	Patrick Reynolds (CnaG)	James Dolan (CnaG)	John Hennigan (CnaG)	Martin Roddy (CnaG)
6th	1929 by-election	Bernard Maguire (FF)	Frank Carty (FF)	Seán Mac Eoin (CnaG)	Patrick Reynolds (CnaG)	James Dolan (CnaG)	John Hennigan (CnaG)	Martin Roddy (CnaG)
7th	1932	Bernard Maguire (FF)	Frank Carty (FF)	Stephen Flynn (FF)	Mary Reynolds (CnaG)	William Browne (FF)	John Hennigan (CnaG)	Martin Roddy (CnaG)
8th	1933	Bernard Maguire (FF)	Frank Carty (FF)	Stephen Flynn (FF)	Patrick Rogers (NCP)	William Browne (FF)	James Dolan (CnaG)	Martin Roddy (CnaG)
9th	1937	Constituency abolished. See Sligo and Leitrim						

Dáil	Election	Deputy (Party)	Deputy (Party)	Deputy (Party)
9th	1937	Matthew Davis (FF)	James Victory (FF)	Seán Mac Eoin (FG)
10th	1938	Erskine H. Childers (FF)	James Victory (FF)	Seán Mac Eoin (FG)
11th	1943	Erskine H. Childers (FF)	Thomas Carter (FF)	Seán Mac Eoin (FG)
12th	1944	Erskine H. Childers (FF)	Thomas Carter (FF)	Seán Mac Eoin (FG)
13th	1948	Constituency abolished. See Longford–Westmeath		

Dáil	Election	Deputy (Party)	Deputy (Party)	Deputy (Party)	Deputy (Party)	Deputy (Party)
2nd	1921	Lorcan Robbins (SF)	Seán Mac Eoin (SF)	Joseph McGuinness (SF)	Laurence Ginnell (SF)	4 seats 1921–1923
3rd	1922	John Lyons (Lab)	Seán Mac Eoin (PT-SF)	Francis McGuinness (PT-SF)	Laurence Ginnell (AT-SF)	4 seats 1921–1923
4th	1923	John Lyons (Ind.)	Conor Byrne (Rep)	James Killane (Rep)	Patrick Shaw (CnaG)	Patrick McKenna (FP)
5th	1927 (Jun)	Henry Broderick (Lab)	Michael Kennedy (FF)	James Victory (FF)	Patrick Shaw (CnaG)	Hugh Garahan (FP)
6th	1927 (Sep)	Henry Broderick (Lab)	Michael Kennedy (FF)	James Killane (FF)	Patrick Shaw (CnaG)	Michael Connolly (CnaG)
6th	1930 by-election	Henry Broderick (Lab)	Michael Kennedy (FF)	James Geoghegan (FF)	Patrick Shaw (CnaG)	Michael Connolly (CnaG)
7th	1932	Francis Gormley (FF)	Michael Kennedy (FF)	James Geoghegan (FF)	Patrick Shaw (CnaG)	Seán Mac Eoin (CnaG)
8th	1933	James Victory (FF)	Michael Kennedy (FF)	James Geoghegan (FF)	Charles Fagan (NCP)	Seán Mac Eoin (CnaG)
9th	1937	Constituency abolished. See Athlone–Longford and Meath–Westmeath				

Dáil	Election	Deputy (Party)	Deputy (Party)	Deputy (Party)	Deputy (Party)	Deputy (Party)
13th	1948	Erskine H. Childers (FF)	Thomas Carter (FF)	Michael Kennedy (FF)	Seán Mac Eoin (FG)	Charles Fagan (Ind.)
14th	1951	Erskine H. Childers (FF)	Frank Carter (FF)	Michael Kennedy (FF)	Seán Mac Eoin (FG)	Charles Fagan (Ind.)
15th	1954	Erskine H. Childers (FF)	Frank Carter (FF)	Michael Kennedy (FF)	Seán Mac Eoin (FG)	Charles Fagan (FG)
16th	1957	Erskine H. Childers (FF)	Ruairí Ó Brádaigh (SF)	Michael Kennedy (FF)	Seán Mac Eoin (FG)	Charles Fagan (FG)
17th	1961	Frank Carter (FF)	Joe Sheridan (Ind.)	Michael Kennedy (FF)	Seán Mac Eoin (FG)	4 seats 1961–1992
18th	1965	Frank Carter (FF)	Joe Sheridan (Ind.)	Patrick Lenihan (FF)	Gerry L'Estrange (FG)	4 seats 1961–1992
19th	1969	Frank Carter (FF)	Joe Sheridan (Ind.)	Patrick Lenihan (FF)	Gerry L'Estrange (FG)	4 seats 1961–1992
19th	1970 by-election	Frank Carter (FF)	Joe Sheridan (Ind.)	Patrick Cooney (FG)	Gerry L'Estrange (FG)	4 seats 1961–1992
20th	1973	Frank Carter (FF)	Joe Sheridan (Ind.)	Patrick Cooney (FG)	Gerry L'Estrange (FG)	4 seats 1961–1992
21st	1977	Albert Reynolds (FF)	Joe Sheridan (Ind.)	Seán Keegan (FF)	Gerry L'Estrange (FG)	4 seats 1961–1992
22nd	1981	Albert Reynolds (FF)	Patrick Cooney (FG)	Seán Keegan (FF)	Gerry L'Estrange (FG)	4 seats 1961–1992
23rd	1982 (Feb)	Albert Reynolds (FF)	Patrick Cooney (FG)	Seán Keegan (FF)	Gerry L'Estrange (FG)	4 seats 1961–1992
24th	1982 (Nov)	Albert Reynolds (FF)	Patrick Cooney (FG)	Mary O'Rourke (FF)	Gerry L'Estrange (FG)	4 seats 1961–1992
25th	1987	Albert Reynolds (FF)	Patrick Cooney (FG)	Mary O'Rourke (FF)	Henry Abbott (FF)	4 seats 1961–1992
26th	1989	Albert Reynolds (FF)	Louis Belton (FG)	Mary O'Rourke (FF)	Paul McGrath (FG)	4 seats 1961–1992
27th	1992	Constituency abolished. See Longford–Roscommon and Westmeath				

Dáil	Election	Deputy (Party)	Deputy (Party)	Deputy (Party)	Deputy (Party)	Deputy (Party)
30th	2007	Willie Penrose (Lab)	Peter Kelly (FF)	Mary O'Rourke (FF)	James Bannon (FG)	4 seats 2007–2024
31st	2011	Willie Penrose (Lab)	Robert Troy (FF)	Nicky McFadden (FG)	James Bannon (FG)	4 seats 2007–2024
31st	2014 by-election	Willie Penrose (Lab)	Robert Troy (FF)	Gabrielle McFadden (FG)	James Bannon (FG)	4 seats 2007–2024
32nd	2016	Willie Penrose (Lab)	Robert Troy (FF)	Kevin "Boxer" Moran (Ind.)	Peter Burke (FG)	4 seats 2007–2024
33rd	2020	Sorca Clarke (SF)	Robert Troy (FF)	Joe Flaherty (FF)	Peter Burke (FG)	4 seats 2007–2024
34th	2024	Sorca Clarke (SF)	Robert Troy (FF)	Kevin "Boxer" Moran (Ind.)	Peter Burke (FG)	Micheál Carrigy (FG)
