= Maurice O'Regan =

Irish Republican and trade unionist (1895-1965)

- Muiris Ó Riagáin

Personal details
- Born: 13 April 1895 Bartlemy, County Cork, Ireland
- Died: 27 November 1965 (aged 70)

Military service
- Branch/service: Royal Navy; Irish Republican Army
- Rank: Squad Leader, 7th Squad, 3rd Battalion, Cork No. 2 Brigade
- Battles/wars: World War I Irish War of Independence

Maurice O'Regan (Irish: Muiris Ó Riagáin) (13 April 1895 - 27 November 1965), sometimes known as Moss O'Regan, was born 13 April 1895 in Bartlemy, County Cork, the son of a shoemaker.

As a teenager, O'Regan joined the Royal Navy and saw active service during World War I. One Sunday morning, while his ship was at sea, O'Regan was on deck while the majority of his Protestant crew mates were attending a religious service below deck. He spotted the antennae of a German U-boat. O'Regan raised the alarm, and his ship's guns destroyed the German vessel. However, O'Regan, upon returning home, reportedly took his naval greatcoat out behind his house and burned it, before joining the Bartlemy flying column of the Irish Republican Army, seeing active service in the Irish War of Independence

He did not fight in the Irish Civil War, remarking in a letter to the Neutral IRA Members' Association that it was "fratricidal".

O'Regan later became a trade union organiser with the Irish Transport and General Workers Union and ran in the 1933 Irish general election for the Labour Party in the Leitrim–Sligo constituency. He got 902 votes and did not secure a seat.

He returned home to Bartlemy and took up the family business of shoemaking for the remainder of his life.

== See also ==
- Leitrim-Sligo
- Florrie O'Donoghue
