= Samuel Holt (politician) =

Irish politician (1880–1929)

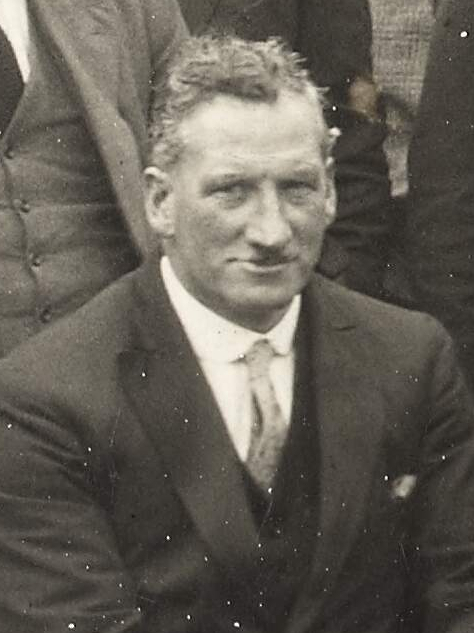
- Holt in 1927

Teachta Dála
- In office March 1925 – 18 April 1929
- Constituency: Leitrim–Sligo

Personal details
- Born: 3 September 1880 Coole, County Westmeath, Ireland
- Died: 18 April 1929 (aged 48) Dublin, Ireland
- Party: Fianna Fáil
- Spouse: Honoria Devaney

Samuel Edward Holt (3 September 1880 – 18 April 1929) was an Irish Fianna Fáil politician.

== Early life ==
Holt was born in Coole, County Westmeath, in 1880, the fifth child of a family of ten of David Holt, from Killina, Carbury, County Kildare, a constable in the Royal Irish Constabulary, and Agnes McColl. The family, which was Church of Ireland, later moved to Charlestown /Jamestown County Roscommon and then into Carrick On Shannon town, County Leitrim. In 1910, Holt married Honoria Devaney, from Toomore, Boher, County Roscommon in Longford Cathedral.

He was assistant clerk and later clerk of Carrick-on-Shannon Poor Law Union and Rural District Council.

== Political career ==
Holt was member of the 5th Battalion, 3rd Brigade, 3rd Western Division of the Irish Republican Army, he was arrested in May 1916 and sentenced to death, which was reprieved and sentenced to Frongoch internment camp. He was also interned in Ballykinlar camp during the Irish War of Independence. He was Sinn Féin director of elections in County Roscommon for George Noble Plunkett and also in the 1923 Irish general election.

He was elected to Dáil Éireann as a Sinn Féin Teachta Dála (TD) for the Leitrim–Sligo constituency at the 1925 by-election on 11 March caused by the resignation of Thomas Carter of Cumann na nGaedheal. He was re-elected at the June 1927 and September 1927 general elections as a Fianna Fáil TD. He died during the 6th Dáil in 1929. The by-election caused by his death was held on 7 June 1929 and was won by Seán Mac Eoin of Cumann na nGaedhael.

== Death ==
Holt died in Dublin on 18 April 1929 of a fever, less than a fortnight after the death of a daughter, Doreen, who was aged seven, also of a fever. He is buried in Jamestown cemetery.

Dáil	Election	Deputy (Party)	Deputy (Party)	Deputy (Party)	Deputy (Party)	Deputy (Party)	Deputy (Party)	Deputy (Party)
4th	1923	Martin McGowan (Rep)	Frank Carty (Rep)	Thomas Carter (CnaG)	Seán Farrell (Rep)	James Dolan (CnaG)	John Hennigan (CnaG)	Alexander McCabe (CnaG)
4th	1925 by-election	Martin McGowan (Rep)	Frank Carty (Rep)	Samuel Holt (Rep)	Seán Farrell (Rep)	James Dolan (CnaG)	John Hennigan (CnaG)	Martin Roddy (CnaG)
5th	1927 (Jun)	John Jinks (NL)	Frank Carty (FF)	Samuel Holt (FF)	Michael Carter (FP)	James Dolan (CnaG)	John Hennigan (CnaG)	Martin Roddy (CnaG)
6th	1927 (Sep)	Bernard Maguire (FF)	Frank Carty (FF)	Samuel Holt (FF)	Patrick Reynolds (CnaG)	James Dolan (CnaG)	John Hennigan (CnaG)	Martin Roddy (CnaG)
6th	1929 by-election	Bernard Maguire (FF)	Frank Carty (FF)	Seán Mac Eoin (CnaG)	Patrick Reynolds (CnaG)	James Dolan (CnaG)	John Hennigan (CnaG)	Martin Roddy (CnaG)
7th	1932	Bernard Maguire (FF)	Frank Carty (FF)	Stephen Flynn (FF)	Mary Reynolds (CnaG)	William Browne (FF)	John Hennigan (CnaG)	Martin Roddy (CnaG)
8th	1933	Bernard Maguire (FF)	Frank Carty (FF)	Stephen Flynn (FF)	Patrick Rogers (NCP)	William Browne (FF)	James Dolan (CnaG)	Martin Roddy (CnaG)
9th	1937	Constituency abolished. See Sligo and Leitrim						
