= John Jinks (politician) =

Irish politician (1871–1934)

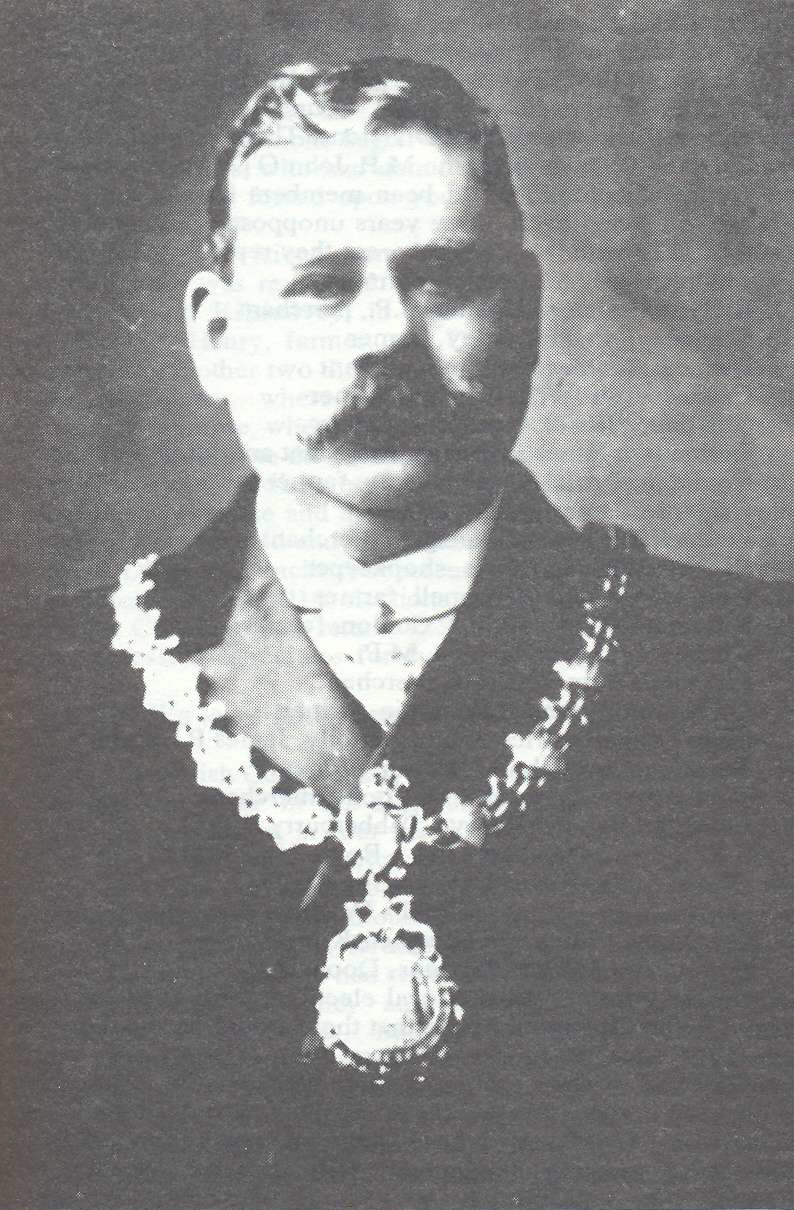
- Jinks as Mayor of Sligo, c. 1920s

Teachta Dála
- In office June 1927 – September 1927
- Constituency: Leitrim–Sligo

Personal details
- Born: John Jenk; 4 May 1871 Drumcliff, County Sligo, Ireland
- Died: 11 September 1934 (aged 63) County Sligo, Ireland
- Party: National League Party
- Other political affiliations: Cumann na nGaedheal; Fine Gael

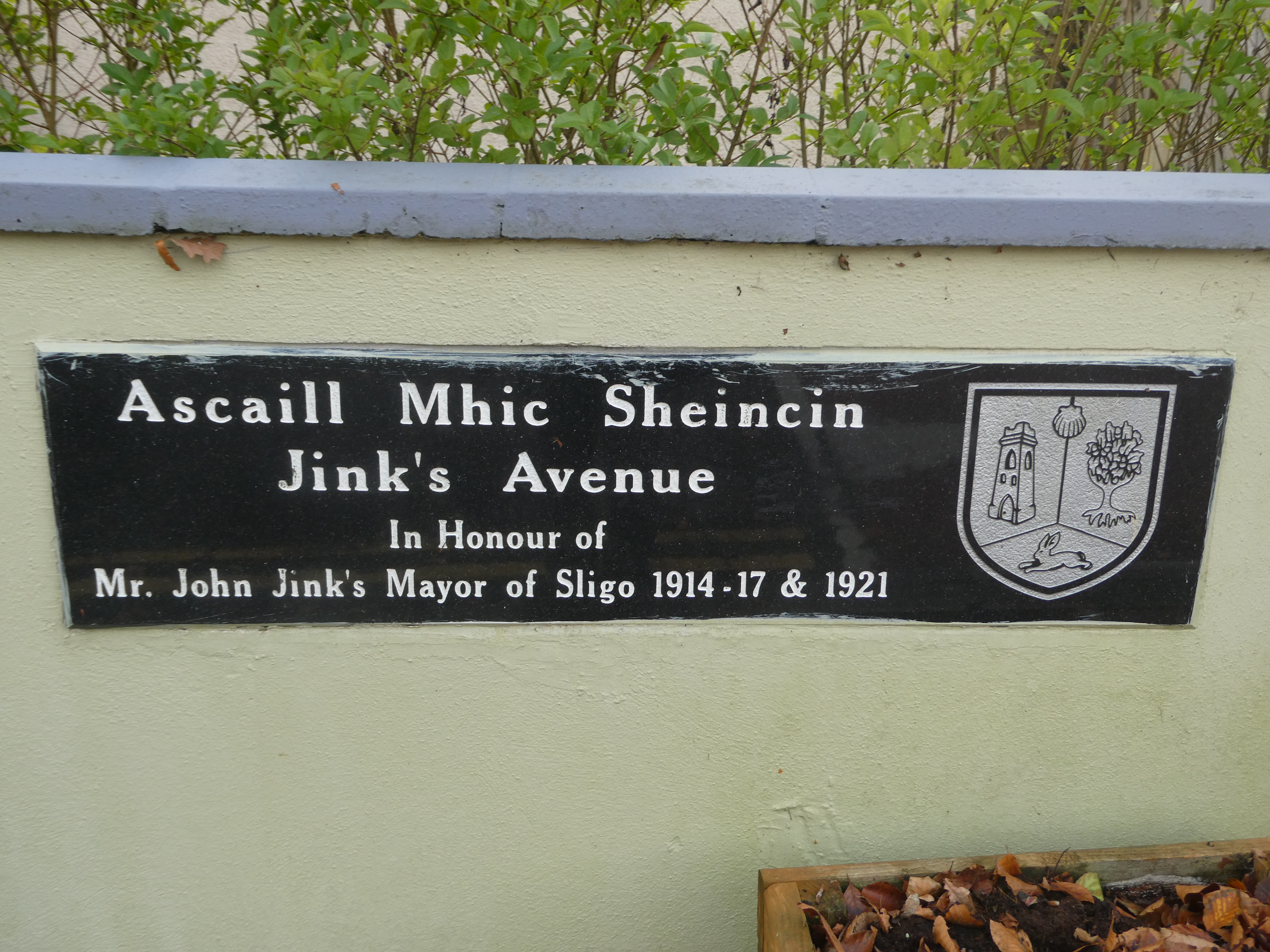
Avenue in Sligo named for Jinks (with his name misspelled with greengrocers' apostrophe).

John Jinks (4 May 1871 – 11 September 1934) (often known as Alderman Jinks from his position as an Alderman on Sligo Corporation) was an Irish politician who served in Dáil Éireann from June to August 1927.

== Biography ==
He was born as John Jenk, to Patrick Jenk (also Jinks), a farmer, and Bridget Gilmartin, of Drumcliff, County Sligo.

An auctioneer and licensed grocer, he was elected to Dáil Éireann as Teachta Dála (TD) for the 7-seat Leitrim–Sligo constituency at the June 1927 general election for the National League Party.

He is most famous for his absence from a crucial vote on 16 August 1927. The Labour Party had proposed a motion of no confidence in the Cumann na nGaedheal Executive Council. They proposed an alternative coalition government with the National League, supported by Fianna Fáil, which had just entered the Dáil. Jinks's abstention resulted in a tied vote (71–71) and the government survived on the casting vote of the Ceann Comhairle. His absence had been unannounced and unauthorised by the party. Many colourful stories have grown up over the years as to the means by which his absence from the voting lobbies was secured. It has been written that two fellow Sligomen and Protestants, Major Bryan Cooper and Bertie Smyllie of The Irish Times "induced" Jinks to take the train back to Sligo that morning and absent himself from the vote lest his constituents discover he had voted for Éamon de Valera. He afterwards explained that he had been opposed to the proposed alliance between the National League, Labour and Fianna Fáil, but did not want to create a split by voting against the party or by announcing his decision in advance. He described the "sensational rumour" of a kidnapping as "sheer invention".

Jinks resigned from the National League on 18 August, stating that he could not "remain any longer a member of a party from which my political outlook so distinctly differs". After Cumann na nGaedheal won two by-elections held on 24 August, a new general election was called. In the September 1927 general election, he stood as an independent candidate, but was not re-elected.

In 1928 and 1934, he was elected to Sligo County Council as a Cumann na nGaedheal and Fine Gael candidate respectively.

A racehorse, Mr Jinks, was named after him and had some success in races in England.

Dáil	Election	Deputy (Party)	Deputy (Party)	Deputy (Party)	Deputy (Party)	Deputy (Party)	Deputy (Party)	Deputy (Party)
4th	1923	Martin McGowan (Rep)	Frank Carty (Rep)	Thomas Carter (CnaG)	Seán Farrell (Rep)	James Dolan (CnaG)	John Hennigan (CnaG)	Alexander McCabe (CnaG)
4th	1925 by-election	Martin McGowan (Rep)	Frank Carty (Rep)	Samuel Holt (Rep)	Seán Farrell (Rep)	James Dolan (CnaG)	John Hennigan (CnaG)	Martin Roddy (CnaG)
5th	1927 (Jun)	John Jinks (NL)	Frank Carty (FF)	Samuel Holt (FF)	Michael Carter (FP)	James Dolan (CnaG)	John Hennigan (CnaG)	Martin Roddy (CnaG)
6th	1927 (Sep)	Bernard Maguire (FF)	Frank Carty (FF)	Samuel Holt (FF)	Patrick Reynolds (CnaG)	James Dolan (CnaG)	John Hennigan (CnaG)	Martin Roddy (CnaG)
6th	1929 by-election	Bernard Maguire (FF)	Frank Carty (FF)	Seán Mac Eoin (CnaG)	Patrick Reynolds (CnaG)	James Dolan (CnaG)	John Hennigan (CnaG)	Martin Roddy (CnaG)
7th	1932	Bernard Maguire (FF)	Frank Carty (FF)	Stephen Flynn (FF)	Mary Reynolds (CnaG)	William Browne (FF)	John Hennigan (CnaG)	Martin Roddy (CnaG)
8th	1933	Bernard Maguire (FF)	Frank Carty (FF)	Stephen Flynn (FF)	Patrick Rogers (NCP)	William Browne (FF)	James Dolan (CnaG)	Martin Roddy (CnaG)
9th	1937	Constituency abolished. See Sligo and Leitrim						
