= James Dolan (Irish politician) =

Irish politician (1884–1955)

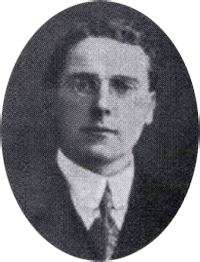
- Dolan, c.1920s

Parliamentary Secretary
- 1927–1932: Industry and Commerce
- 1924–1927: Government Chief Whip

Leas-Cheann Comhairle of Dáil Éireann
- In office 1 July 1927 – 25 August 1927
- Ceann Comhairle: Michael Hayes
- Preceded by: Pádraic Ó Máille
- Succeeded by: Patrick Hogan

Teachta Dála
- In office January 1933 – July 1937
- In office August 1923 – February 1932
- Constituency: Leitrim–Sligo
- In office May 1921 – August 1923
- Constituency: Leitrim–Roscommon North
- In office December 1918 – May 1921
- Constituency: County Leitrim

Personal details
- Born: 16 October 1884 Manorhamilton, County Leitrim, Ireland
- Died: 14 July 1955 (aged 70)
- Party: Cumann na nGaedheal
- Other political affiliations: Sinn Féin
- Spouse: Loreto Dolan
- Children: 6
- Relatives: Charles Dolan (brother)

James Nicholas Dolan (16 October 1884 – 14 July 1955) was an Irish politician and TD for County Leitrim constituencies from 1918 to 1937.

Dolan was born in Manorhamilton, County Leitrim, the son of John Dolan, merchant, and Bridget Fitzpatrick. His brother, Charles Dolan, was an Irish Parliamentary Party MP for North Leitrim from 1906 to 1908, who resigned his seat to run as the first ever Sinn Féin parliamentary candidate.

A Sinn Féin activist, and member of the Irish Republican Brotherhood, James Dolan was interned in Frongoch internment camp after the 1916 Easter Rising.

He was first elected as Sinn Féin MP at the 1918 general election for County Leitrim. At the 1921 general election, he was elected unopposed as a TD for the Leitrim–Roscommon North constituency, and supported the Anglo-Irish Treaty. At the 1922 general election, he was again elected unopposed for Leitrim–Roscommon North. At the 1923 general election, he was elected for the Leitrim–Sligo constituency.

Dolan joined the government of W. T. Cosgrave as Parliamentary Secretary to the President with responsibility as Government Chief Whip in 1924. He served in that post until 1927. He served as Parliamentary Secretary to the Minister for Industry and Commerce from 1927 to 1932. Dolan lost his Dáil seat at the 1932 general election. He regained his seat in 1933 and became a Fine Gael TD later that year when the new party was formed. He failed to be selected for Fine Gael at the 1937 general election for the new Leitrim constituency. He contested the election as an Independent candidate, but was unsuccessful. He subsequently retired from politics.

Parliament of the United Kingdom
New constituency	Member of Parliament for County Leitrim; 1918–1922	Constituency abolished
Oireachtas
New constituency	Teachta Dála for County Leitrim; 1918–1921	Constituency abolished
Political offices
Preceded by Daniel McCarthy	Government Chief Whip; 1924–1927	Succeeded by Eamonn Duggan
New office	Parliamentary Secretary to the Minister for Industry and Commerce; 1927–1932	Office abolished

Dáil	Election	Deputy (Party)	Deputy (Party)	Deputy (Party)	Deputy (Party)
2nd	1921	Thomas Carter (SF)	James Dolan (SF)	Andrew Lavin (SF)	George Noble Plunkett (SF)
3rd	1922	Thomas Carter (PT-SF)	James Dolan (PT-SF)	Andrew Lavin (PT-SF)	George Noble Plunkett (AT-SF)
4th	1923	Constituency abolished. See Leitrim–Sligo and Roscommon			

Dáil	Election	Deputy (Party)	Deputy (Party)	Deputy (Party)	Deputy (Party)	Deputy (Party)	Deputy (Party)	Deputy (Party)
4th	1923	Martin McGowan (Rep)	Frank Carty (Rep)	Thomas Carter (CnaG)	Seán Farrell (Rep)	James Dolan (CnaG)	John Hennigan (CnaG)	Alexander McCabe (CnaG)
4th	1925 by-election	Martin McGowan (Rep)	Frank Carty (Rep)	Samuel Holt (Rep)	Seán Farrell (Rep)	James Dolan (CnaG)	John Hennigan (CnaG)	Martin Roddy (CnaG)
5th	1927 (Jun)	John Jinks (NL)	Frank Carty (FF)	Samuel Holt (FF)	Michael Carter (FP)	James Dolan (CnaG)	John Hennigan (CnaG)	Martin Roddy (CnaG)
6th	1927 (Sep)	Bernard Maguire (FF)	Frank Carty (FF)	Samuel Holt (FF)	Patrick Reynolds (CnaG)	James Dolan (CnaG)	John Hennigan (CnaG)	Martin Roddy (CnaG)
6th	1929 by-election	Bernard Maguire (FF)	Frank Carty (FF)	Seán Mac Eoin (CnaG)	Patrick Reynolds (CnaG)	James Dolan (CnaG)	John Hennigan (CnaG)	Martin Roddy (CnaG)
7th	1932	Bernard Maguire (FF)	Frank Carty (FF)	Stephen Flynn (FF)	Mary Reynolds (CnaG)	William Browne (FF)	John Hennigan (CnaG)	Martin Roddy (CnaG)
8th	1933	Bernard Maguire (FF)	Frank Carty (FF)	Stephen Flynn (FF)	Patrick Rogers (NCP)	William Browne (FF)	James Dolan (CnaG)	Martin Roddy (CnaG)
9th	1937	Constituency abolished. See Sligo and Leitrim						
