= John Hennigan (politician) =

Irish politician

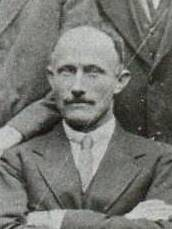
- Hennigan in 1920

Teachta Dála
- In office August 1923 – January 1933
- Constituency: Leitrim–Sligo

Personal details
- Party: Sinn Féin; Fine Gael; Cumann na nGaedheal

John Hennigan was an Irish politician and farmer.

He was a member of Sligo County Council from 1920 to 1942.

He was an unsuccessful independent candidate in Sligo–Mayo East at the 1922 general election. He was first elected to Dáil Éireann as a Cumann na nGaedheal Teachta Dála (TD) for Leitrim–Sligo at the 1923 general election. He was re-elected at each subsequent election until he lost his seat at the 1933 general election.

Dáil	Election	Deputy (Party)	Deputy (Party)	Deputy (Party)	Deputy (Party)	Deputy (Party)	Deputy (Party)	Deputy (Party)
4th	1923	Martin McGowan (Rep)	Frank Carty (Rep)	Thomas Carter (CnaG)	Seán Farrell (Rep)	James Dolan (CnaG)	John Hennigan (CnaG)	Alexander McCabe (CnaG)
4th	1925 by-election	Martin McGowan (Rep)	Frank Carty (Rep)	Samuel Holt (Rep)	Seán Farrell (Rep)	James Dolan (CnaG)	John Hennigan (CnaG)	Martin Roddy (CnaG)
5th	1927 (Jun)	John Jinks (NL)	Frank Carty (FF)	Samuel Holt (FF)	Michael Carter (FP)	James Dolan (CnaG)	John Hennigan (CnaG)	Martin Roddy (CnaG)
6th	1927 (Sep)	Bernard Maguire (FF)	Frank Carty (FF)	Samuel Holt (FF)	Patrick Reynolds (CnaG)	James Dolan (CnaG)	John Hennigan (CnaG)	Martin Roddy (CnaG)
6th	1929 by-election	Bernard Maguire (FF)	Frank Carty (FF)	Seán Mac Eoin (CnaG)	Patrick Reynolds (CnaG)	James Dolan (CnaG)	John Hennigan (CnaG)	Martin Roddy (CnaG)
7th	1932	Bernard Maguire (FF)	Frank Carty (FF)	Stephen Flynn (FF)	Mary Reynolds (CnaG)	William Browne (FF)	John Hennigan (CnaG)	Martin Roddy (CnaG)
8th	1933	Bernard Maguire (FF)	Frank Carty (FF)	Stephen Flynn (FF)	Patrick Rogers (NCP)	William Browne (FF)	James Dolan (CnaG)	Martin Roddy (CnaG)
9th	1937	Constituency abolished. See Sligo and Leitrim						
