= Farmers' Party (Ireland) =

Defunct Irish political party

Farmers' Party Páirtí na bhFeirmeoirí
- Leader: Denis Gorey (1922–1927); Patrick Baxter (1927); Michael Heffernan (1927–1932)
- Founded: 1922
- Dissolved: 1932
- Ideology: Agrarianism

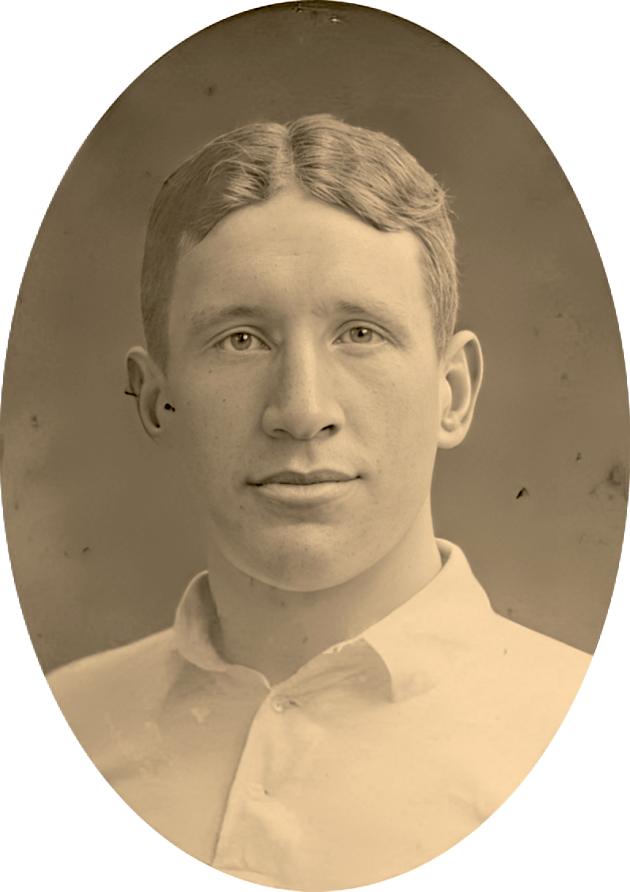
Michael Heffernan was the party's third and final leader

The Farmers' Party or Farmers' Union (Irish: Páirtí na bhFeirmeoirí) was an agrarian political party in the Irish Free State between 1922 and 1932.

== History ==
The party won seven seats in Dáil Éireann at the 1922 general election, the first in the Free State, and increased that total to fifteen in the 1923 election. These seats were concentrated in richer rural areas, an indicator that the party's support base was farmers with large holdings of land rather than the more numerous and poorer small farmers. At the 1925 Seanad election, the party won three seats.

During the 1920s, the Farmers' Party supported the Cumann na nGaedheal government. Support was strongest among the deputies who supported free trade. Among these members were the party leadership, particularly leader Denis Gorey, who proposed a merger of the Farmers' Party with Cumann na nGaedheal. Supporters of protectionism favoured continuation as an independent party, more criticism of the government, and from 1926 co-operation with the Fianna Fáil party, founded in 1926. This division, between the more conservative free-trading large farmers and the more radical protectionist small farmers, harmed the party and eventually led to the partitioning of its votes between the two main parties. The pro-independence side won the tactical debate, and Gorey joined Cumann na nGaedheal before for the June 1927 general election.

The party lost nine of its fifteen TDs during 1927 to defections and two election defeats. It continued to support the Cumann na Gaedheal government throughout the late 1920s, most importantly in the vote of no confidence that preceded the September 1927 election. After that election, Farmers' Party leader Michael Heffernan was appointed as Parliamentary Secretary to the Minister for Posts and Telegraphs to ensure his party's support for the resulting minority government. Heffernan would himself join Cumann na nGaedheal before the subsequent election.

By the 1930s, the party had little representation and less hope for an independent future. The party's large farmer supporters had migrated to Cumann na nGaedheal, while it had never truly succeeded in becoming the dominant party among small farmers, whose affinity was with Fianna Fáil. After the 1932 general election, only a small core of intransigents unwilling to co-operate with either Cumann na nGaedheal or Fianna Fáil remained in Dáil Éireann. Later in 1932, the Farmers' Party disbanded and these three TDs joined the new National Centre Party, contesting the 1933 election under that banner before unifying with Cumann na nGaedhael later in the year to form Fine Gael.

In the late 1930s attempts were made to found a new farmers' party. A new party, the Irish Farmers' Federation, split over the issue of derating; many small farmers were opposed to such a measure, believing that the increase in indirect taxation which would be sure to result would harm their interests. These small farmers set up Clann na Talmhan, which was launched in 1938. It was much more radical and left-wing than the original Farmers' Party, and was supported mainly by small farmers.

== General election results ==
| Election | Seats won | ± | Position | First Pref votes | % | Government | Leader |
|---|---|---|---|---|---|---|---|
| 1922 | 7 / 128 | ▲7 | ▲4th | 48,718 | 7.8% | Opposition | Denis Gorey |
| 1923 | 15 / 153 | ▲8 | ▲3rd | 127,184 | 12.1% | Opposition | Denis Gorey |
| 1927 (Jun) | 11 / 153 | ▼4 | ▼4th | 101,955 | 8.9% | Opposition (supported CnG Minority Gov't) | Michael Heffernan |
| 1927 (Sep) | 6 / 153 | ▼5 | 4th | 74,626 | 6.4% | Arrangement with CnG Minority Gov't | Michael Heffernan |
| 1932 | 3 / 153 | ▼3 | 4th | 22,899 | 1.8% | Opposition | |

== See also ==
- Category:Farmers' Party (Ireland) politicians
