= National League Party =

Defunct political party in Ireland

National League
- Founder: William Redmond; Thomas O'Donnell
- Founded: 1926
- Dissolved: 1931
- Ideology: Pro-Treaty; Pro-Commonwealth; Fiscal conservatism

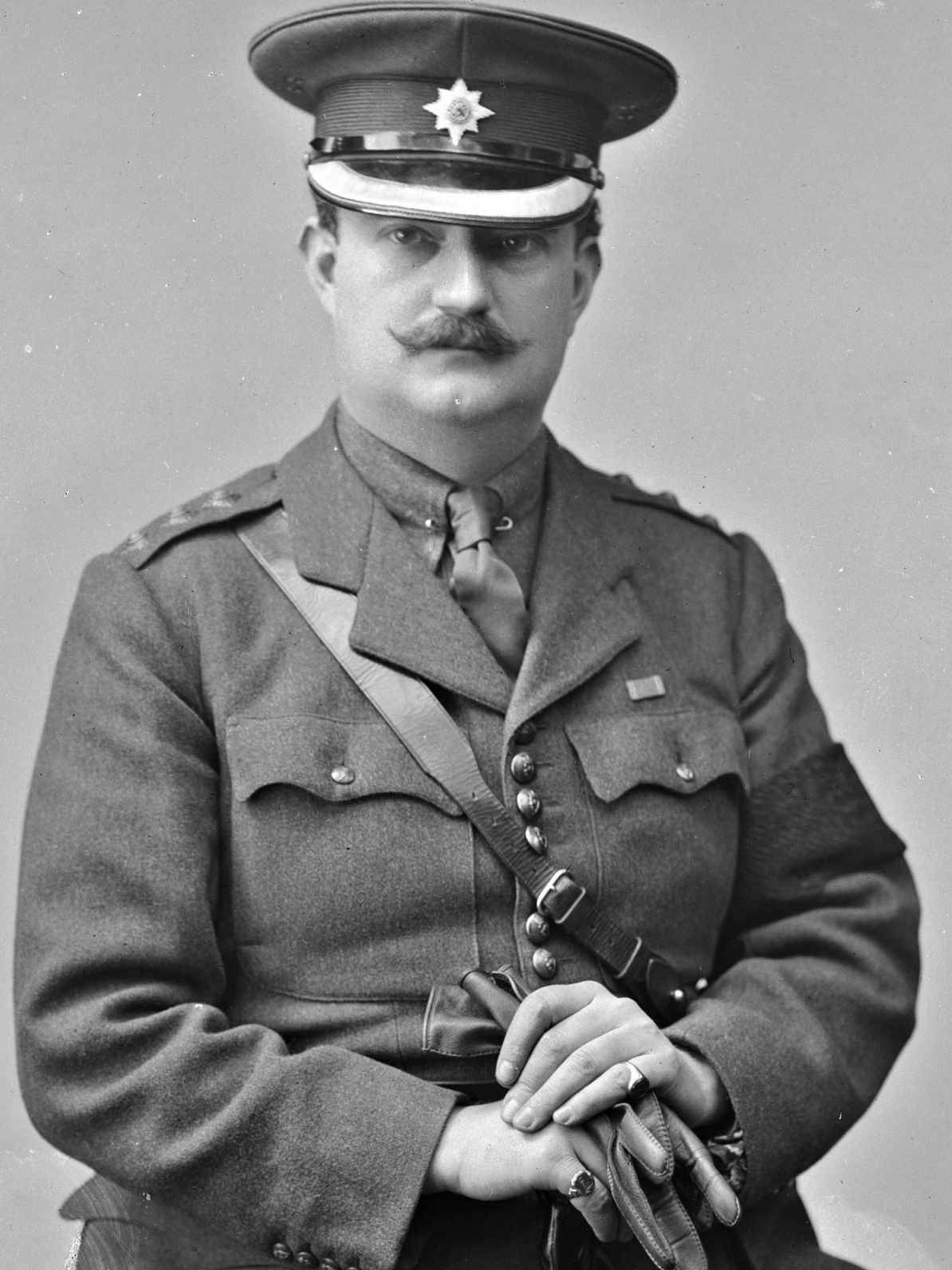
William Archer Redmond's presence in the party cemented its connection to the Irish Parliamentary Party

The National League was a political party in Ireland. It was founded in 1926 by William Redmond and Thomas O'Donnell in support of the Anglo-Irish Treaty, a close relationship with the United Kingdom, continued membership of the British Commonwealth and conservative fiscal policy.

Its broadly Anglophile stance brought it the support of many Unionists. Supporters of the former Irish Parliamentary Party were also a natural target group, given that the party's leader was the son of John Redmond, who had himself been leader of the nationalist party. A third group to which it sought to appeal, according to Manning (1972), comprised middle-class economic sectoral interests whose members were alienated by the policies of the Cumann na nGaedheal government, such as licensed vintners. These groups would not benefit from the more statist economic approach of the Fianna Fáil or Labour parties. However, all these efforts were largely ineffectual. The contemporary political scientist Warner Moss described the League as "a party of malcontents representing nothing fundamental in Irish political divisions."

In the June 1927 general election, the National League won eight seats in Dáil Éireann and entered opposition. In August it supported Fianna Fáil's motion of no confidence in the Cumann na nGaedheal government, in an attempt to form an alternative government under Labour leader Thomas Johnson, with the National League as the junior partner and Fianna Fáil supporting the resulting minority government. However, two League TDs opposed this tactic—Vincent Rice, who defected to Cumann na nGaedheal, and John Jinks, who was absent from the vote. As such the motion failed, and the National League was portrayed as politically opportunist in its attempt at an alliance with two very different parties; National League supporters would have been far more likely to favour a continued Cumann na nGaedheal government than to allow the quasi-revolutionary Fianna Fáil to influence government policy.

The political discord associated with the Cumann na nGaedheal minority government prompted the September 1927 general election. Only two National League TDs, Redmond and James Coburn, were elected. The financial strain of two general elections in four months took its toll on the small parties, and the National League declared bankruptcy in 1928. It was disbanded in 1931.

== General election results ==
| Election | Seats won | ± | Position | First Pref votes | % | Government | Leader |
|---|---|---|---|---|---|---|---|
| 1927 (Jun) | 8 / 153 | ▲8 | ▲5th | 83,598 | 7.3% | Opposition | William Redmond |
| 1927 (Sep) | 2 / 153 | ▼6 | 5th | 18,990 | 1.6% | Opposition | William Redmond |

== See also ==
- Category:National League Party politicians
