= September 1927 Irish general election =

Election to the 6th Dáil

- 15 September 1927

153 seats in Dáil Éireann (Note: Including Michael Hayes (CnaG), returned automatically for the National University of Ireland as outgoing Ceann Comhairle, under Art. 21 of the Constitution, as amended by the Constitution (Amendment No. 2) Act 1927, and s. 2 of the Electoral (Amendment) Act 1927.) 77 seats needed for a majority
- Turnout: 69.0% ▲0.9 pp
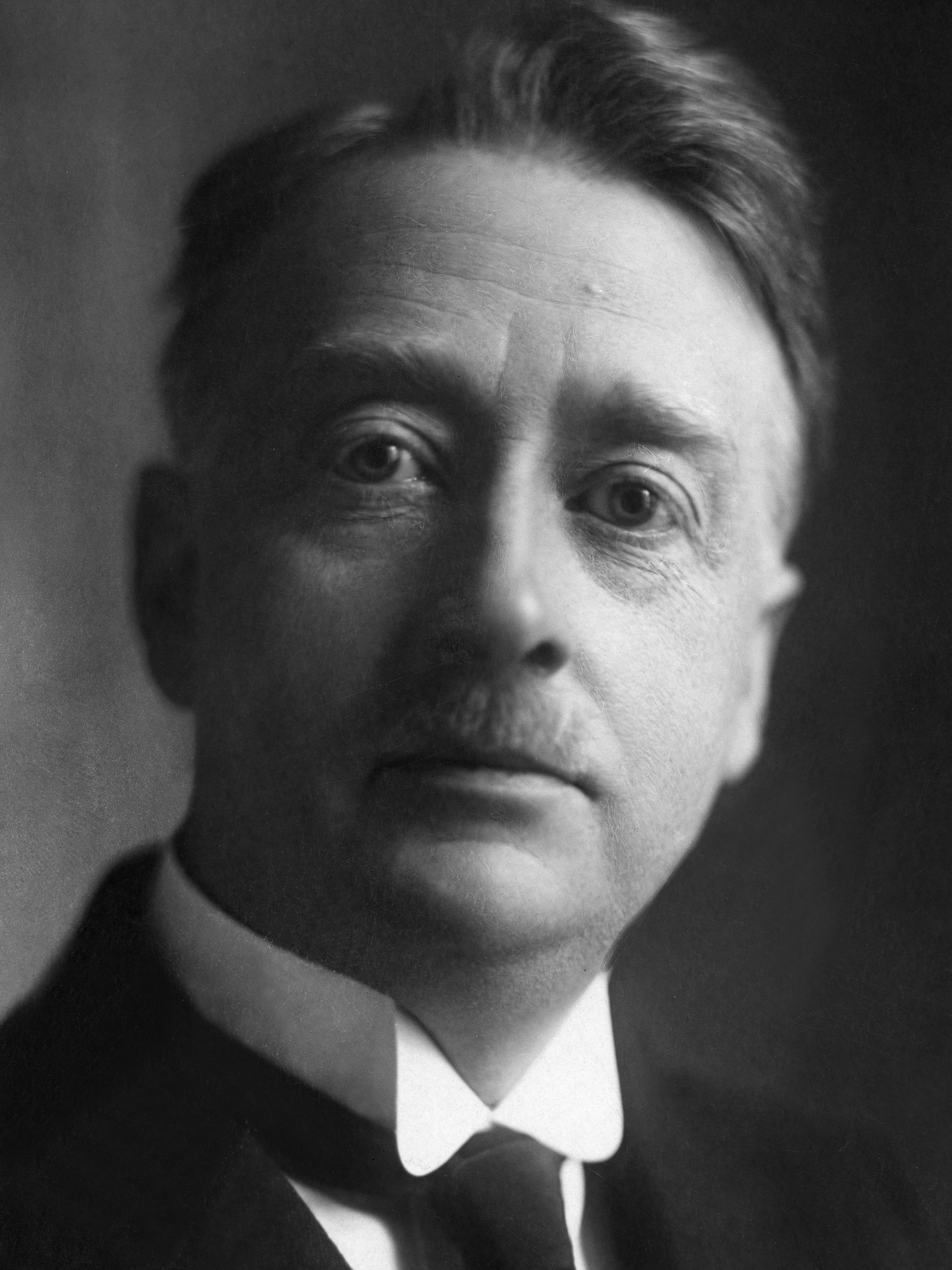

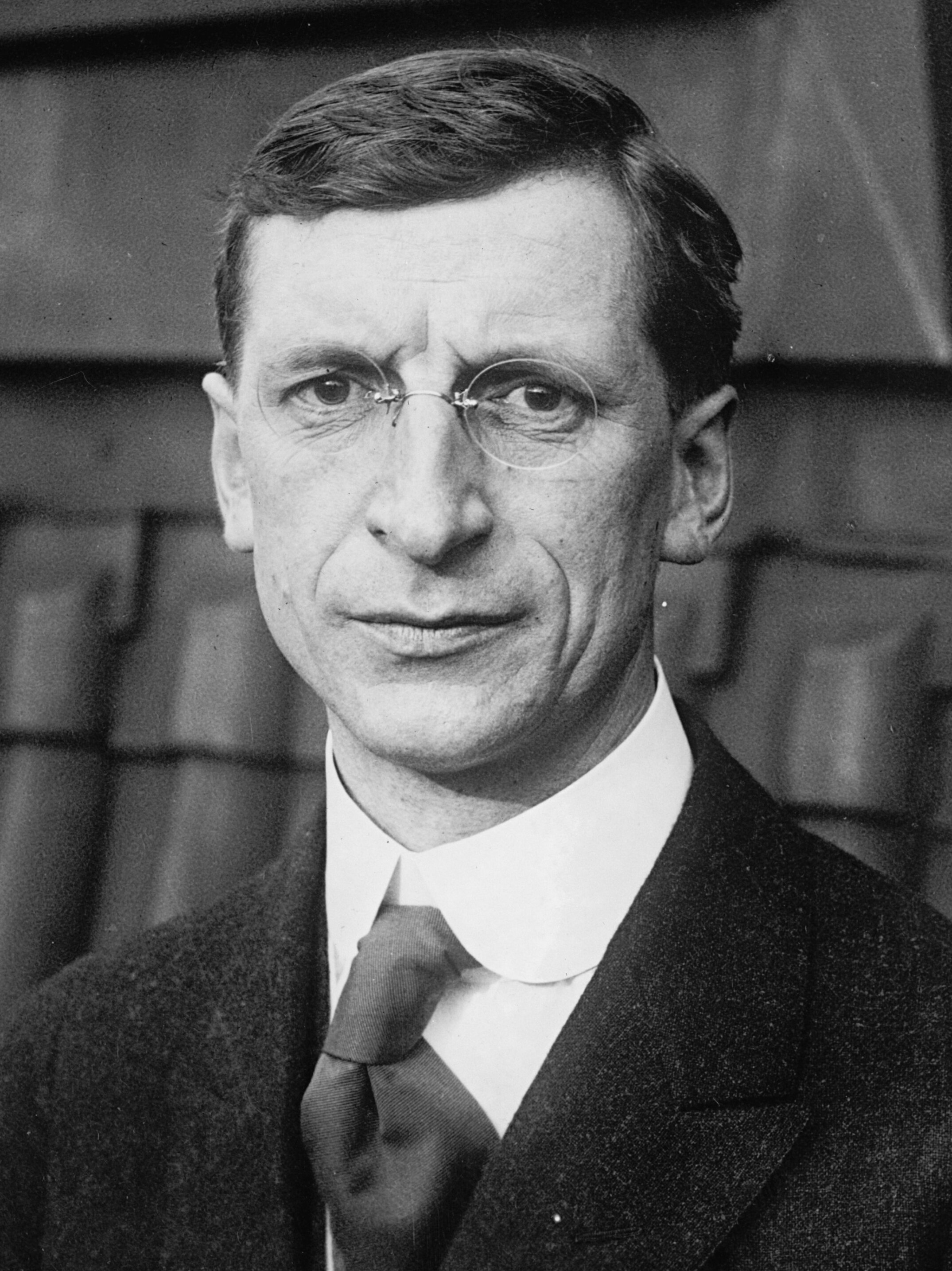

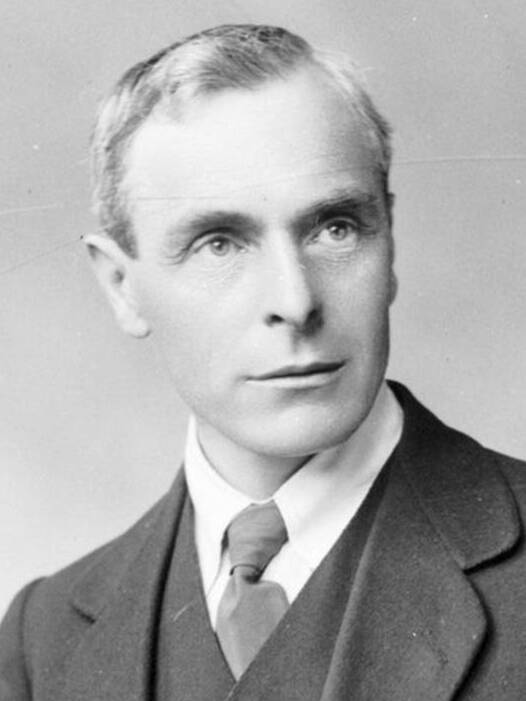

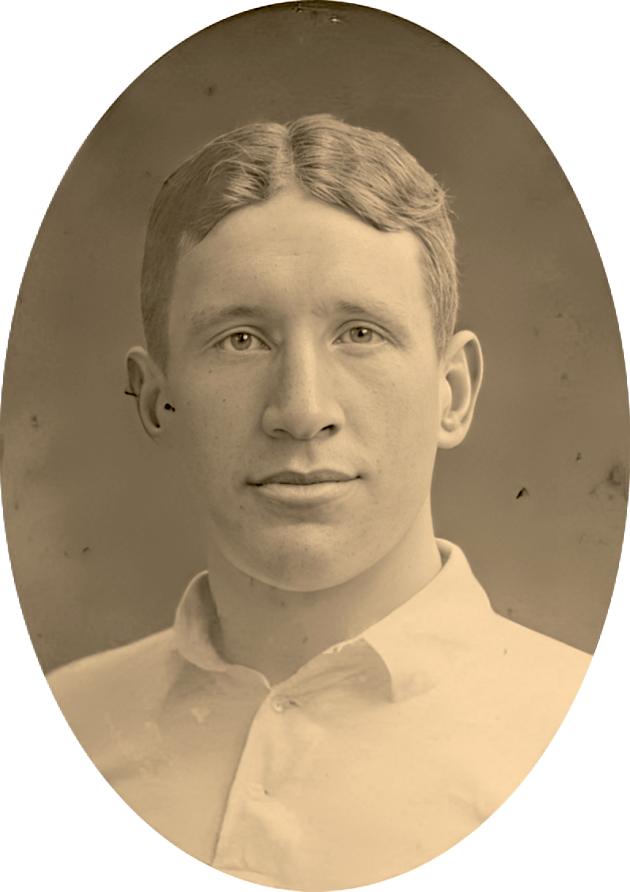

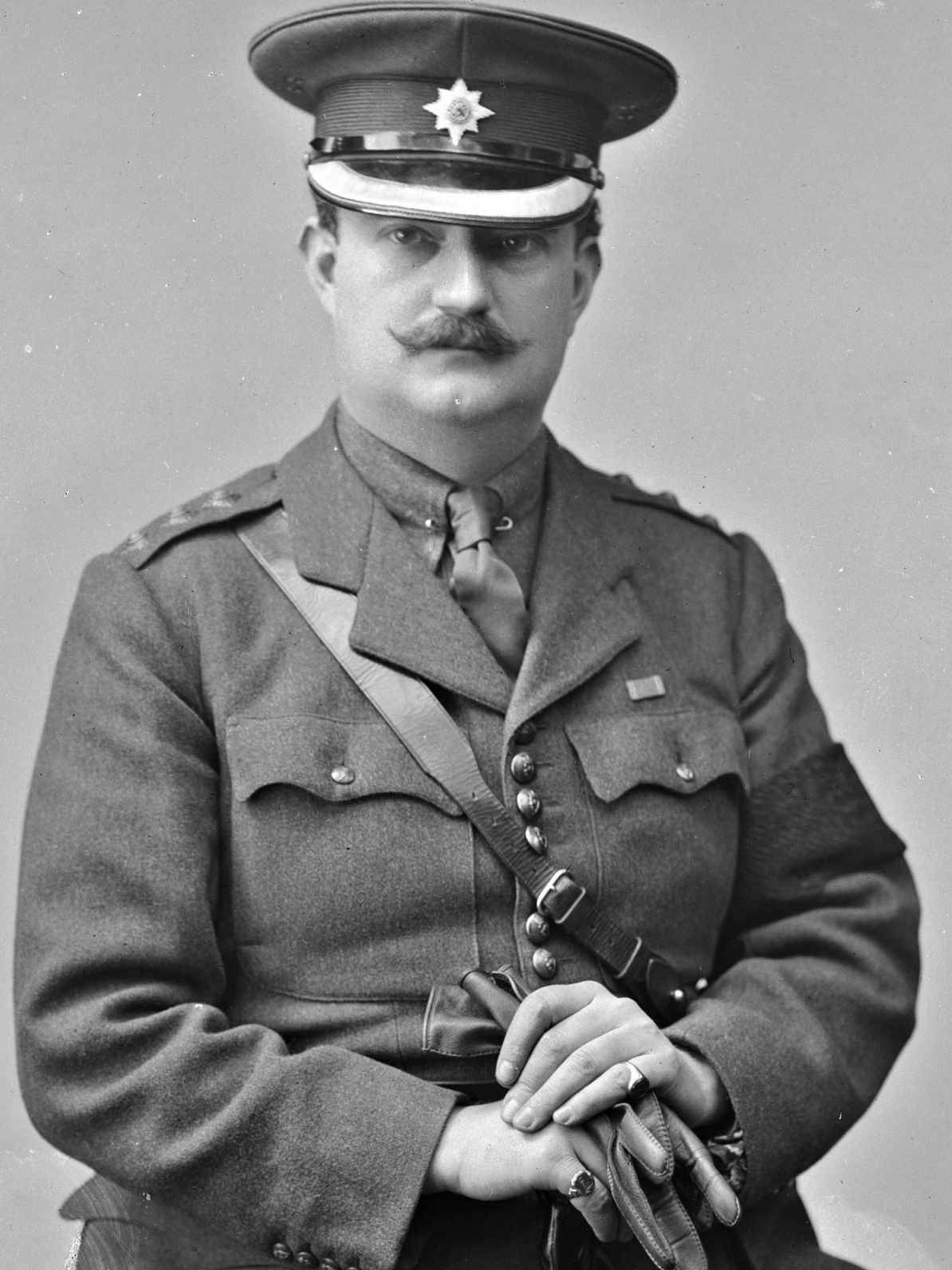

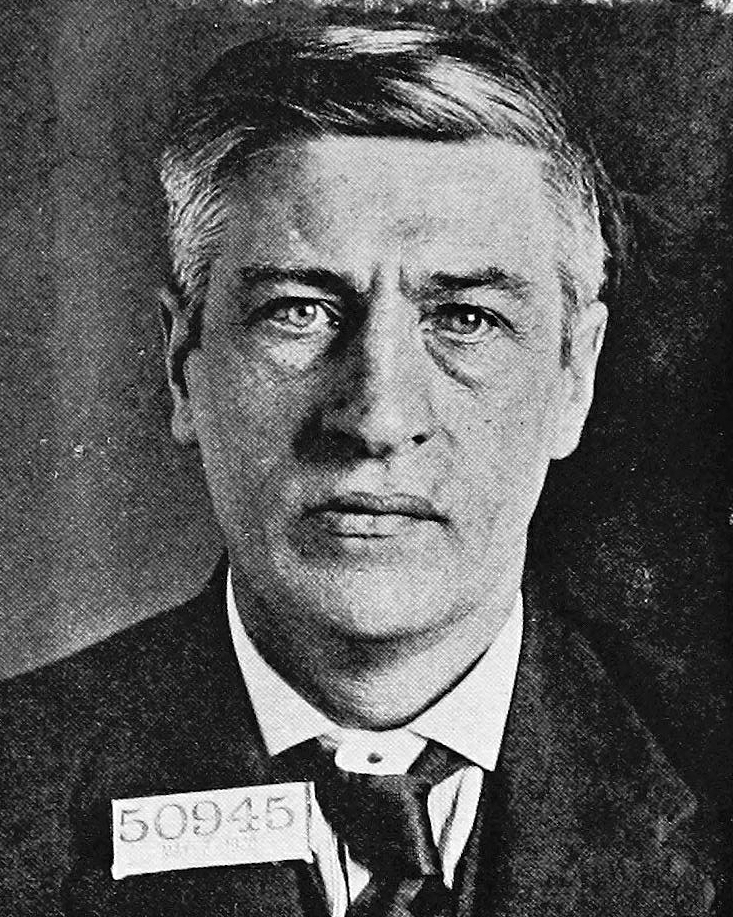
| | First party | Second party | Third party |
|---|---|---|---|
| Leader | W. T. Cosgrave | Éamon de Valera | Thomas Johnson |
| Party | Cumann na nGaedheal | Fianna Fáil | Labour |
| Leader since | April 1923 | 26 March 1926 | 1914 |
| Leader's seat | Cork Borough | Clare | Dublin County (defeated) |
| Last election | 47 seats, 27.4% | 44 seats, 26.2% | 22 seats, 12.6% |
| Seats won | 62 | 57 | 13 |
| Seat change | ▲15 | ▲13 | ▼9 |
| Popular vote | 453,028 | 411,777 | 106,184 |
| Percentage | 38.6% | 35.2% | 9.1% |
| Swing | ▲11.2 pp | ▲9.0 pp | ▼3.5 pp |
| | Fourth party | Fifth party | Sixth party |
| Leader | Michael Heffernan | William Redmond | James Larkin |
| Party | Farmers' Party | National League | Irish Worker League |
| Leader since | 1927 | 1926 | 1923 |
| Leader's seat | Tipperary | Waterford | Dublin North |
| Last election | 11 seats, 8.9% | 8 seats, 7.3% | New |
| Seats won | 6 | 2 | 1 (Note: Although Jim Larkin won a seat in Dublin North, he was almost immediately disqualified from the position due to declaring bankruptcy as a result of losing a libel case brought against him by William O'Brien. As a result, a by-election was held for his seat on 3 April 1928. The winner of that by-election was Vincent Rice (CnaG), who defeated Kathleen Clarke (FF) and Larkin.) |
| Seat change | ▼5 | ▼6 | ▲1 |
| Popular vote | 74,626 | 18,990 | 12,473 |
| Percentage | 6.4% | 1.6% | 1.1% |
| Swing | ▼2.5 pp | ▼5.7 pp | ▲1.1 pp |
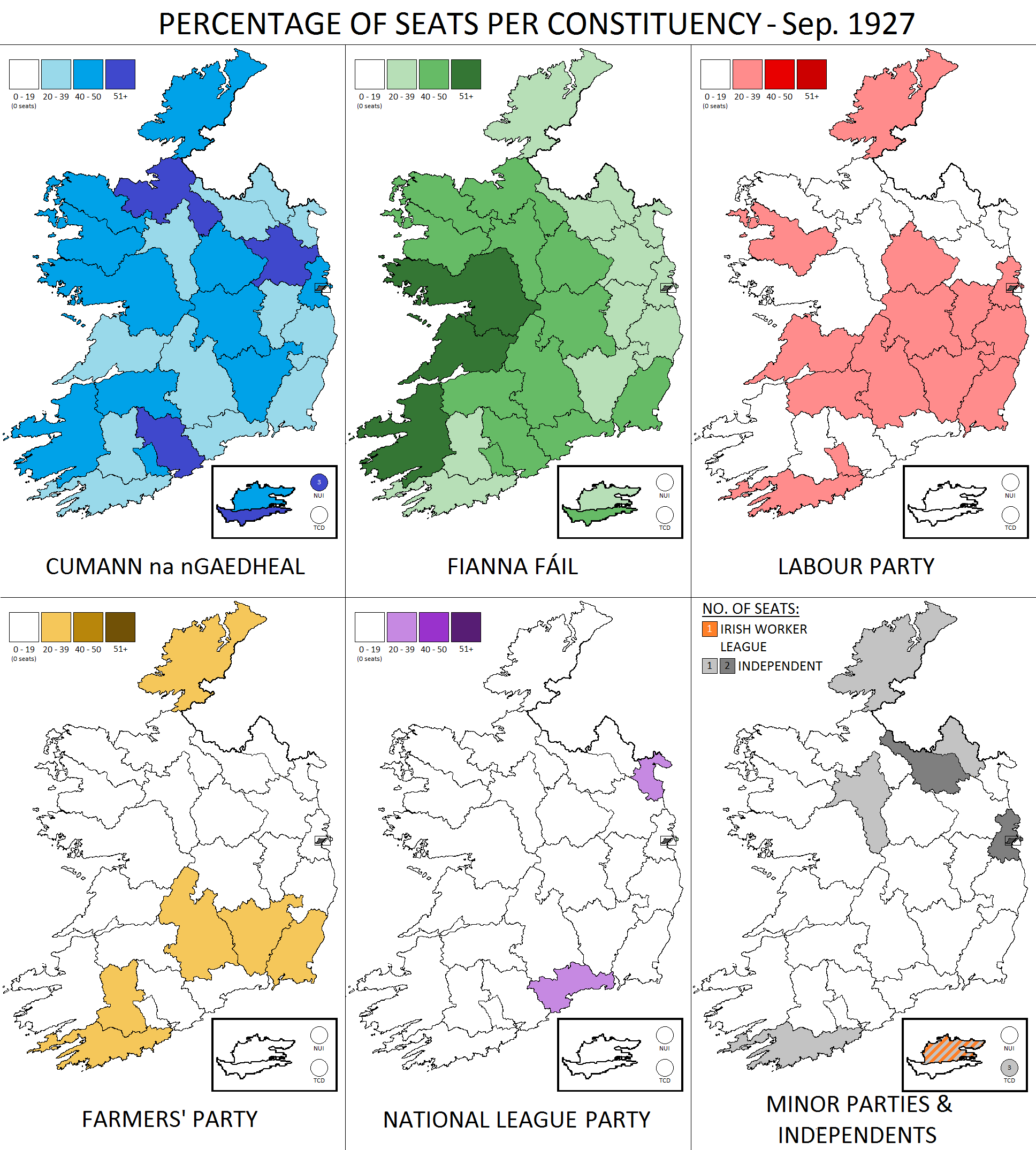
President of the Executive Council before election
W. T. Cosgrave
Cumann na nGaedheal
President of the Executive Council after election
W. T. Cosgrave
Cumann na nGaedheal

The September 1927 Irish general election to the 6th Dáil was held on Thursday, 15 September, following the dissolution of the 5th Dáil on 25 August by Governor-General Tim Healy on the request of President of the Executive Council W. T. Cosgrave.

The 6th Dáil met on 11 October 1927 to nominate the president and Executive Council of the Irish Free State for appointment by the Governor-General. Cosgrave was re-appointed leading a new minority government of Cumann na nGaedheal with the support of the Farmers' Party.

== Prelude ==
Following the June 1927 Irish general election, only three seats separated the two largest parties in the 5th Dáil, Cumann na nGaedheal and Fianna Fáil. Fianna Fáil entered the Dáil in August, and days later gave its support to a motion of no confidence in the Cumann na nGaedheal government proposed by Labour Party leader Thomas Johnson. Johnson had hoped to form a government with the National League and the support of Fianna Fáil. The Cumann na nGaedheal government had the backing of the Farmers' Party and most of the independent TDs. When the vote was taken, John Jinks, a National League TD, failed to attend. The deputy leader of the Labour Party, Thomas J. O'Connell, was in Canada and also was unable to participate in the crucial vote. As a result, the vote was a tie and the Ceann Comhairle voted with the government. The motion failed.

== Campaign ==
On 25 August, Cumann na nGaedheal won two by-elections. W. T. Cosgrave called a general election in the hope of securing an increased majority. Cumann na nGaedheal recruited four TDs who had supported Cosgrave in the vote of confidence to stand as candidates for the party: Bryan Cooper (Dublin County), John Daly (Cork East), Myles Keogh (Dublin South) and Vincent Rice (Dublin South). Fianna Fáil campaigned on a promise of self-sufficiency. The Labour Party had done well on its last outing and was hoping, and was predicted, to win extra seats, in spite of internal divisions. The Farmers' Party represented the needs of agricultural labourers. Sinn Féin, weakened after de Valera had split to form Fianna Fáil, had been reduced to five seats in the June 1927 election, and did not contest the September 1927 election, due to lack of financial assets.

== Result ==
Election to the 6th Dáil – 15 September 1927
| Party | Leader | Seats | ± | % of seats | First pref. votes | % FPv | ±% |
|---|---|---|---|---|---|---|---|
| Cumann na nGaedheal | W. T. Cosgrave | 62 | +15 | 40.5 | 453,028 | 38.7 | +11.3 |
| Fianna Fáil | Éamon de Valera | 57 | +13 | 37.3 | 411,777 | 35.2 | +9.1 |
| Labour | Thomas Johnson | 13 | –9 | 8.5 | 106,184 | 9.1 | –3.4 |
| Farmers' Party | Michael Heffernan | 6 | –5 | 3.9 | 74,626 | 6.4 | –2.5 |
| National League | William Redmond | 2 | –6 | 1.3 | 18,990 | 1.6 | –5.7 |
| Irish Worker League | James Larkin | 1 | New | 0.7 | 12,473 | 1.1 | – |
| Town Tenants' Association | | | 0 | 0 | 832 | 0.1 | 0 |
| Sinn Féin | John J. O'Kelly | 0 | –5 | 0 | 0 | –3.6 | –5.7 |
| Independent | N/A | 12 | –4 | 7.8 | 92,959 | 7.9 | –5.5 |
| Spoilt votes | | | | | 21,886 | —N/a | —N/a |
| Total | | 153 | 0 | 100 | 1,192,755 | 100 | —N/a |
| Electorate/Turnout | | | | | 1,730,177 | 69.0 | —N/a |

=== Voting summary ===
First preference vote
| Cumann na nGaedheal | 38.69% |
| Fianna Fáil | 35.17% |
| Labour | 9.07% |
| Farmers' | 6.37% |
| National League Party | 1.62% |
| Irish Worker League | 1.07% |
| Others | 0.07% |
| Independent | 7.94% |

=== Seats summary ===
Dáil seats
| Cumann na nGaedheal | 40.52% |
| Fianna Fáil | 37.25% |
| Labour | 8.50% |
| Farmers' | 3.92% |
| National League Party | 1.31% |
| Irish Worker League | 0.65% |
| Independent | 7.84% |

== Government formation ==
Cumann na nGaedheal formed the 4th Executive Council of the Irish Free State, a minority government, with the support of the Farmers' Party and Independent TDs, with W. T. Cosgrave serving again as President of the Executive Council. The leader of the Farmers' Party served as a Parliamentary Secretary. In 1930, the Executive Council would resign following the loss of a vote on legislation. The 5th Executive Council of the Irish Free State was formed soon after with the same composition.

== Changes in membership ==
=== First time TDs ===
- William Aird
- Seán Brady
- Robert Briscoe
- Edmond Carey
- Michael Connolly
- Eamonn Cooney
- Peter de Loughry
- Patrick Gorry
- Stephen Jordan
- William Kent
- Arthur Matthews
- Joseph Mongan
- Daniel O'Leary
- Martin Sexton
- Richard Walsh

=== Outgoing TDs ===
- Caitlín Brugha (Retired)
- Kathleen Clarke (Defeated)
- John Jinks (Defeated)
- Thomas Johnson (Labour Party leader, defeated)
- Timothy Quill (Defeated)
- Austin Stack (Retired)
- J. J. Walsh (Retired)
