= 8th Dáil =

TDs from 1933 to 1937

| ← | 7th Dáil | 9th Dáil | → |

Overview
- Legislative body: Dáil Éireann
- Jurisdiction: Irish Free State
- Meeting place: Leinster House
- Term: 8 February 1933 – 14 June 1937
- Election: 1933 general election
- Government: 7th executive council
- Members: 153
- Ceann Comhairle: Frank Fahy
- President of the Executive Council: Éamon de Valera
- Vice-President of the Executive Council: Seán T. O'Kelly
- Chief Whip: Patrick Little
- Leader of the Opposition: W. T. Cosgrave

Sessions
- 1st: 8 February 1933 – 9 August 1933
- 2nd: 27 September 1933 – 10 August 1934
- 3rd: 12 September 1934 – 25 July 1935
- 4th: 30 October 1935 – 13 August 1936
- 5th: 4 November 1936 – 14 June 1937

The 8th Dáil was elected at the 1933 general election on 24 January 1933 and met on 8 February 1933. The members of Dáil Éireann, the Chamber of Deputies of the Oireachtas (legislature) of the Irish Free State, are known as TDs. Initially, it was one of two houses of the Oireachtas, sitting with the First Seanad constituted as the 1931 Seanad and the 1934 Seanad. From 29 May 1936, it was the sole house of the Oireachtas, after the disbandment of Seanad Éireann under the Constitution (Amendment No. 24) Act 1936. From 11 December 1936, it had the sole legislative functions in the State, after the role of the king (represented by the Governor-General) was removed for domestic purposes under the Constitution (Amendment No. 27) Act 1936. On 14 June 1937, the 8th Dáil approved the draft text of the Constitution of Ireland.

The 8th Dáil was dissolved by the Ceann Comhairle Frank Fahy on 14 June 1937 on the direction of the Executive Council. The 8th Dáil lasted 4 years, 126 days. The draft text of the Constitution of Ireland was approved in a plebiscite on 1 July, the same date as the 1937 general election.

== Composition of the 8th Dáil ==
- 7th Executive Council
- Providing confidence and supply

| Party | Jan. 1933 | June 1937 | Change |
|---|---|---|---|
| Fianna Fáil | 77 | 77 | Steady |
| Cumann na nGaedheal (Note: On 8 September 1933, Cumann na nGaedheal and the National Centre Party, along with the Army Comrades Association (Blueshirts), merged to form Fine Gael.) | 48 | —N/a | ▼48 |
| National Centre Party | 11 | —N/a | ▼11 |
| Labour | 8 | 8 | Steady |
| Fine Gael | —N/a | 53 | ▲53 |
| Independent | 9 | 11 | ▲2 |
| Ceann Comhairle | —N/a | 1 | ▲1 |
| Vacant | —N/a | 3 | ▲3 |
| Total | 153 | | |

Fianna Fáil formed the 7th executive council of the Irish Free State, a minority government dependent on the support of the Labour Party.

=== Graphical representation ===
This is a graphical comparison of party strengths in the 8th Dáil from February 1933. This was not the official seating plan.

== Ceann Comhairle ==
On 8 February 1933, Frank Fahy (FF), who had served as Ceann Comhairle in the previous Dáil, was proposed by Éamon de Valera and seconded by William Norton for the position, and was elected without a vote.

== TDs by constituency ==
The 153 TDs elected at the 1933 general election are listed by Dáil constituency.

Members of the 8th Dáil
| Constituency | Name | Party |
|---|---|---|
| Carlow–Kilkenny | Desmond FitzGerald | Cumann na nGaedheal |
| Carlow–Kilkenny | Seán Gibbons | Fianna Fáil |
| Carlow–Kilkenny | Richard Holohan | National Centre Party |
| Carlow–Kilkenny | Thomas Derrig | Fianna Fáil |
| Carlow–Kilkenny | James Pattison | Labour |
| Cavan | Patrick McGovern | National Centre Party |
| Cavan | John Joe O'Reilly | Cumann na nGaedheal |
| Cavan | Michael Sheridan | Fianna Fáil |
| Cavan | Paddy Smith | Fianna Fáil |
| Clare | Patrick Burke | Cumann na nGaedheal |
| Clare | Éamon de Valera | Fianna Fáil |
| Clare | Patrick Hogan | Labour |
| Clare | Patrick Houlihan | Fianna Fáil |
| Clare | Seán O'Grady | Fianna Fáil |
| Cork Borough | Richard Anthony | Independent |
| Cork Borough | W. T. Cosgrave | Cumann na nGaedheal |
| Cork Borough | William Desmond | Cumann na nGaedheal |
| Cork Borough | Thomas Dowdall | Fianna Fáil |
| Cork Borough | Hugo Flinn | Fianna Fáil |
| Cork East | William Broderick | Cumann na nGaedheal |
| Cork East | Martin Corry | Fianna Fáil |
| Cork East | Patrick Daly | Cumann na nGaedheal |
| Cork East | William Kent | National Centre Party |
| Cork East | Patrick Murphy | Fianna Fáil |
| Cork North | Daniel Corkery | Fianna Fáil |
| Cork North | Seán Moylan | Fianna Fáil |
| Cork North | Daniel O'Leary | Cumann na nGaedheal |
| Cork West | James Burke | Cumann na nGaedheal |
| Cork West | Tom Hales | Fianna Fáil |
| Cork West | Timothy J. Murphy | Labour |
| Cork West | Timothy O'Donovan | National Centre Party |
| Cork West | Eamonn O'Neill | Cumann na nGaedheal |
| Donegal | Neal Blaney | Fianna Fáil |
| Donegal | Brian Brady | Fianna Fáil |
| Donegal | James Dillon | National Centre Party |
| Donegal | Hugh Doherty | Fianna Fáil |
| Donegal | Michael Óg McFadden | Cumann na nGaedheal |
| Donegal | Daniel McMenamin | Cumann na nGaedheal |
| Donegal | James Myles | Independent |
| Donegal | Joseph O'Doherty | Fianna Fáil |
| Dublin North | Patrick Belton | Cumann na nGaedheal |
| Dublin North | Cormac Breathnach | Fianna Fáil |
| Dublin North | Alfie Byrne | Independent |
| Dublin North | Eamonn Cooney | Fianna Fáil |
| Dublin North | Richard Mulcahy | Cumann na nGaedheal |
| Dublin North | Seán T. O'Kelly | Fianna Fáil |
| Dublin North | Vincent Rice | Cumann na nGaedheal |
| Dublin North | Oscar Traynor | Fianna Fáil |
| Dublin South | James Beckett | Cumann na nGaedheal |
| Dublin South | Robert Briscoe | Fianna Fáil |
| Dublin South | Peadar Doyle | Cumann na nGaedheal |
| Dublin South | Thomas Kelly | Fianna Fáil |
| Dublin South | Seán Lemass | Fianna Fáil |
| Dublin South | James Lynch | Fianna Fáil |
| Dublin South | James McGuire | Cumann na nGaedheal |
| Dublin County | John A. Costello | Cumann na nGaedheal |
| Dublin County | Seán Brady | Fianna Fáil |
| Dublin County | Henry Dockrell | Cumann na nGaedheal |
| Dublin County | John Good | Independent |
| Dublin County | Seán MacEntee | Fianna Fáil |
| Dublin County | Batt O'Connor | Cumann na nGaedheal |
| Dublin County | Gearóid O'Sullivan | Cumann na nGaedheal |
| Dublin County | Margaret Mary Pearse | Fianna Fáil |
| Dublin University | Ernest Alton | Independent |
| Dublin University | James Craig | Independent |
| Dublin University | William Thrift | Independent |
| Galway | Gerald Bartley | Fianna Fáil |
| Galway | Patrick Beegan | Fianna Fáil |
| Galway | Seán Broderick | Cumann na nGaedheal |
| Galway | Frank Fahy | Fianna Fáil |
| Galway | Patrick Hogan | Cumann na nGaedheal |
| Galway | Stephen Jordan | Fianna Fáil |
| Galway | Séamus Keely | Fianna Fáil |
| Galway | Mark Killilea Snr | Fianna Fáil |
| Galway | Martin McDonogh | Cumann na nGaedheal |
| Kerry | Frederick Crowley | Fianna Fáil |
| Kerry | John Flynn | Fianna Fáil |
| Kerry | Eamon Kissane | Fianna Fáil |
| Kerry | Fionán Lynch | Cumann na nGaedheal |
| Kerry | Tom McEllistrim | Fianna Fáil |
| Kerry | Denis Daly | Fianna Fáil |
| Kerry | John O'Sullivan | Cumann na nGaedheal |
| Kildare | Thomas Harris | Fianna Fáil |
| Kildare | Sydney Minch | Cumann na nGaedheal |
| Kildare | William Norton | Labour |
| Leitrim–Sligo | William Browne | Fianna Fáil |
| Leitrim–Sligo | Frank Carty | Fianna Fáil |
| Leitrim–Sligo | James Dolan | Cumann na nGaedheal |
| Leitrim–Sligo | Stephen Flynn | Fianna Fáil |
| Leitrim–Sligo | Bernard Maguire | Fianna Fáil |
| Leitrim–Sligo | Martin Roddy | Cumann na nGaedheal |
| Leitrim–Sligo | Patrick Rogers | National Centre Party |
| Leix–Offaly | Patrick Boland | Fianna Fáil |
| Leix–Offaly | William Davin | Labour |
| Leix–Offaly | Eamon Donnelly | Fianna Fáil |
| Leix–Offaly | Jack Finlay | National Centre Party |
| Leix–Offaly | Thomas F. O'Higgins | Cumann na nGaedheal |
| Limerick | George C. Bennett | Cumann na nGaedheal |
| Limerick | Daniel Bourke | Fianna Fáil |
| Limerick | Tadhg Crowley | Fianna Fáil |
| Limerick | Michael Keyes | Labour |
| Limerick | Donnchadh Ó Briain | Fianna Fáil |
| Limerick | James Reidy | Cumann na nGaedheal |
| Limerick | Robert Ryan | Fianna Fáil |
| Longford–Westmeath | Charles Fagan | National Centre Party |
| Longford–Westmeath | James Geoghegan | Fianna Fáil |
| Longford–Westmeath | Michael Kennedy | Fianna Fáil |
| Longford–Westmeath | Seán Mac Eoin | Cumann na nGaedheal |
| Longford–Westmeath | James Victory | Fianna Fáil |
| Louth | Frank Aiken | Fianna Fáil |
| Louth | James Coburn | Independent |
| Louth | James Murphy | Cumann na nGaedheal |
| Mayo North | Micheál Clery | Fianna Fáil |
| Mayo North | Michael Davis | Cumann na nGaedheal |
| Mayo North | James Morrisroe | Cumann na nGaedheal |
| Mayo North | P. J. Ruttledge | Fianna Fáil |
| Mayo South | James FitzGerald-Kenney | Cumann na nGaedheal |
| Mayo South | Michael Kilroy | Fianna Fáil |
| Mayo South | Edward Moane | Fianna Fáil |
| Mayo South | Martin Nally | Cumann na nGaedheal |
| Mayo South | Richard Walsh | Fianna Fáil |
| Meath | Robert Davitt | Cumann na nGaedheal |
| Meath | James Kelly | Fianna Fáil |
| Meath | Matthew O'Reilly | Fianna Fáil |
| Monaghan | Alexander Haslett | Independent |
| Monaghan | Eamon Rice | Fianna Fáil |
| Monaghan | Conn Ward | Fianna Fáil |
| National University | Helena Concannon | Fianna Fáil |
| National University | Conor Maguire | Fianna Fáil |
| National University | Patrick McGilligan | Cumann na nGaedheal |
| Roscommon | Michael Brennan | Cumann na nGaedheal |
| Roscommon | Gerald Boland | Fianna Fáil |
| Roscommon | Frank MacDermot | National Centre Party |
| Roscommon | Patrick O'Dowd | Fianna Fáil |
| Tipperary | Dan Breen | Fianna Fáil |
| Tipperary | Séamus Burke | Cumann na nGaedheal |
| Tipperary | Richard Curran | National Centre Party |
| Tipperary | Andrew Fogarty | Fianna Fáil |
| Tipperary | Seán Hayes | Fianna Fáil |
| Tipperary | Daniel Morrissey | Cumann na nGaedheal |
| Tipperary | Martin Ryan | Fianna Fáil |
| Waterford | Seán Goulding | Fianna Fáil |
| Waterford | Patrick Little | Fianna Fáil |
| Waterford | Bridget Redmond | Cumann na nGaedheal |
| Waterford | Nicholas Wall | National Centre Party |
| Wexford | Richard Corish | Labour |
| Wexford | Osmond Esmonde | Cumann na nGaedheal |
| Wexford | John Keating | Cumann na nGaedheal |
| Wexford | Patrick Kehoe | Fianna Fáil |
| Wexford | James Ryan | Fianna Fáil |
| Wicklow | James Everett | Labour |
| Wicklow | Séamus Moore | Fianna Fáil |
| Wicklow | Dermot O'Mahony | Cumann na nGaedheal |

=== Changes ===
| Date | Constituency | Loss | Gain | Note |
|---|---|---|---|---|
| 8 February 1933 | Galway | Fianna Fáil | Ceann Comhairle | Frank Fahy takes office as Ceann Comhairle |
| 12 July 1933 | Dublin University | Independent | | Death of James Craig |
| 8 September 1933 | 48 TDs | Cumann na nGaedheal | Fine Gael | New party formed after merger |
| 8 September 1933 | 10 TDs | National Centre Party | Fine Gael | New party formed after merger |
| 8 September 1933 | Cork East | National Centre Party | Independent | William Kent became Independent on formation of Fine Gael |
| 3 October 1933 | Louth | Independent | Fine Gael | James Coburn joins Fine Gael |
| 13 October 1933 | Dublin University | | Independent | Robert Rowlette wins the seat vacated by the death of Craig |
| 30 October 1934 | Dublin North | Fine Gael | Independent | Patrick Belton expelled for his continued support for Eoin O'Duffy as party leader |
| 24 November 1934 | Galway | Fine Gael | | Death of Martin McDonogh |
| 7 February 1935 | Dublin County | Fine Gael | | Death of Batt O'Connor |
| 17 June 1935 | Dublin County | | Fine Gael | Cecil Lavery holds the seat vacated by the death of O'Connor |
| October 1935 | Roscommon | Fine Gael | Independent | Frank MacDermot resigns from Fine Gael |
| 19 June 1935 | Galway | | Fianna Fáil | Eamon Corbett wins the seat vacated by the death of McDonogh |
| 14 July 1936 | Galway | Fine Gael | | Death of Patrick Hogan |
| 22 July 1936 | Wexford | Fine Gael | | Death of Osmond Esmonde |
| 13 August 1936 | Galway | | Fianna Fáil | Martin Neilan wins the seat vacated by the death of Hogan |
| 17 August 1936 | Wexford | | Fianna Fáil | Denis Allen wins the seat vacated by the death of Esmonde |
| 10 September 1936 | Cork West | Fine Gael | | Death of James Burke |
| 3 November 1936 | NUI | Fianna Fáil | | Appointment of Conor Maguire as a judge of the High Court |
| 23 December 1936 | Longford–Westmeath | Fianna Fáil | | Appointment of James Geoghegan as a judge of the Supreme Court |
