= John Prior =

John Prior may refer to:

- John Prior (politician), Irish Cumann na nGaedheal politician
- John D. Prior (1840–1923), British trade unionist
- John Prior (musician) (born 1960), Australian musician, composer and producer
- John Prior (cricketer) (born 1960), Irish cricketer

== See also ==
- John Pryor (disambiguation)
