= Cork West (Dáil constituency) =

Dáil constituency (1923–1961)

- Former Dáil constituency

Former constituency
- Created: 1923
- Abolished: 1961
- Seats: 5 (1923–1948); 3 (1948–1961)
- Local government area: County Cork
- Created from: Cork Mid, North, South, South East and West
- Replaced by: Cork South-West

Cork West was a parliamentary constituency represented in Dáil Éireann, the lower house of the Irish parliament or Oireachtas from 1923 to 1961. The constituency elected 5 (and later 3) deputies (Teachtaí Dála, commonly known as TDs) to the Dáil, on the system of proportional representation by means of the single transferable vote (PR-STV).

== History ==
It was created in 1923 as a 5-seat constituency, a partial replacement for the 8 seat Cork Mid, North, South, South East and West constituency. It was first used for the 1923 general election to the 4th Dáil.

It was reduced to a 3 seater for the 1948 general election to the 12th Dáil, and remained at that size until its abolition for the 1961 general election to the 17th Dáil. It was then partially replaced by the new Cork South-West constituency.

== Boundaries ==
It consisted of the county electoral areas of Bandon, Bantry and Dunmanway in the administrative county of Cork.

== TDs ==
Teachtaí Dála (TDs) for Cork West 1923–1961
Key to parties: CnaG = Cumann na nGaedheal; FP = Farmers' Party; FF = Fianna Fáil; FG = Fine Gael; Ind. = Independent; Lab = Labour; NCP = National Centre Party; Rep = Republican
Dáil	Election	Deputy (Party)	Deputy (Party)	Deputy (Party)	Deputy (Party)	Deputy (Party)
4th	1923	Timothy J. Murphy (Lab)	Seán Buckley (Rep)	Cornelius Connolly (CnaG)	John Prior (CnaG)	Timothy O'Donovan (FP)
5th	1927 (Jun)	Timothy J. Murphy (Lab)	Thomas Mullins (FF)	Timothy Sheehy (CnaG)	Jasper Wolfe (Ind.)	Timothy O'Donovan (FP)
6th	1927 (Sep)	Timothy J. Murphy (Lab)	Thomas Mullins (FF)	Timothy Sheehy (CnaG)	Jasper Wolfe (Ind.)	Timothy O'Donovan (FP)
7th	1932	Timothy J. Murphy (Lab)	Raphael Keyes (FF)	Eamonn O'Neill (CnaG)	Jasper Wolfe (Ind.)	Timothy O'Donovan (FP)
8th	1933	Timothy J. Murphy (Lab)	Tom Hales (FF)	Eamonn O'Neill (CnaG)	James Burke (CnaG)	Timothy O'Donovan (NCP)
9th	1937	Timothy J. Murphy (Lab)	Timothy O'Sullivan (FF)	Daniel O'Leary (FG)	Eamonn O'Neill (FG)	Timothy O'Donovan (FG)
10th	1938	Timothy J. Murphy (Lab)	Timothy O'Sullivan (FF)	Seán Buckley (FF)	Eamonn O'Neill (FG)	Timothy O'Donovan (FG)
11th	1943	Timothy J. Murphy (Lab)	Timothy O'Sullivan (FF)	Seán Buckley (FF)	Patrick O'Driscoll (Ind.)	Timothy O'Donovan (FG)
12th	1944	Timothy J. Murphy (Lab)	Timothy O'Sullivan (FF)	Seán Buckley (FF)	Patrick O'Driscoll (Ind.)	Eamonn O'Neill (FG)
13th	1948	Timothy J. Murphy (Lab)	Timothy O'Sullivan (FF)	Seán Collins (FG)	3 seats 1948–1961	
13th	1949 by-election	William J. Murphy (Lab)	Timothy O'Sullivan (FF)	Seán Collins (FG)	3 seats 1948–1961	
14th	1951	Michael Pat Murphy (Lab)	Timothy O'Sullivan (FF)	Seán Collins (FG)	3 seats 1948–1961	
15th	1954	Michael Pat Murphy (Lab)	Edward Cotter (FF)	Seán Collins (FG)	3 seats 1948–1961	
16th	1957	Michael Pat Murphy (Lab)	Edward Cotter (FF)	Florence Wycherley (Ind.)	3 seats 1948–1961	
17th	1961	Constituency abolished. See Cork South-West				

Note: The columns in this table are used only for presentational purposes, and no significance should be attached to the order of columns. For details of the order in which seats were won at each election, see the detailed results of that election.

== Elections ==
*: Outgoing TD

=== 1957 general election ===
1957 general election: Cork West
Party	Candidate	FPv%	Count			
Party	Candidate	FPv%	1	2	3	4
Labour	Michael Pat Murphy	24.5	6,454	6,851		
Fine Gael	Seán Collins	22.3	5,869	6,044	6,252	6,341
Fianna Fáil	Edward Cotter	19.9	5,255	8,310		
Independent	Florence Wycherley	17.7	4,666	5,056	6,310	6,393
Fianna Fáil	Michael Finn	15.6	4,125			
Electorate: 33,789 Valid: 26,369 Quota: 6,593 Turnout: 78.0%

=== 1954 general election ===
1954 general election: Cork West
Party	Candidate	FPv%	Count				
Party	Candidate	FPv%	1	2	3	4	5
Labour	Michael Pat Murphy	25.4	7,315				
Fianna Fáil	Edward Cotter	21.8	6,270	8,982			
Clann na Talmhan	Florence Wycherley	14.7	4,238	4,389	4,984	5,012	6,181
Fine Gael	Seán Collins	13.9	4,003	4,097	4,204	4,251	6,641
Fine Gael	John O'Sullivan	12.6	3,635	3,864	4,093	4,132	
Fianna Fáil	Michael Finn	11.6	3,339				
Electorate: 34,791 Valid: 28,800 Quota: 7,201 Turnout: 82.8%

=== 1951 general election ===
1951 general election: Cork West
Party	Candidate	FPv%	Count	
Party	Candidate	FPv%	1	2
Fianna Fáil	Timothy O'Sullivan	25.8	7,571	
Fine Gael	Seán Collins	25.7	7,515	
Labour	Michael Pat Murphy	20.8	6,103	6,758
Independent	Charles John Bryan	16.2	4,732	5,572
Fianna Fáil	James Moynihan	11.5	3,373	
Electorate: 35,960 Valid: 29,294 Quota: 7,324 Turnout: 81.5%

=== 1949 by-election ===
Following the death of the Labour Party TD Timothy J. Murphy, a by-election was held on 15 June 1949. The seat was won by the Labour Party candidate William J. Murphy, the son of the deceased TD.

1949 by-election: Cork West
Party	Candidate	FPv%	Count
Party	Candidate	FPv%	1
Labour	William J. Murphy	63.3	18,909
Fianna Fáil	Edward Cotter	36.7	10,950
Electorate: 36,699 Valid: 29,859 Quota: 14,930 Turnout: 81.4%

=== 1948 general election ===
1948 general election: Cork West
Party	Candidate	FPv%	Count						
Party	Candidate	FPv%	1	2	3	4	5	6	7
Fianna Fáil	Timothy O'Sullivan	21.0	6,348	6,432	6,498	6,694	8,636		
Labour	Timothy J. Murphy	20.4	6,165	6,267	6,653	7,511	8,291		
Clann na Talmhan	Charles John Bryan	15.7	4,750	4,791	5,021	5,472	5,908	6,361	6,489
Fine Gael	Seán Collins	15.4	4,643	4,732	5,805	6,412	6,775	6,944	7,150
Fianna Fáil	Patrick John Burke	11.4	3,439	3,448	3,515	3,712			
Clann na Poblachta	Thomas Roycroft	7.1	2,135	2,633	2,680				
Fine Gael	Daniel J. Kingston	6.2	1,877	1,901					
Clann na Poblachta	Liam Dwyer	2.8	857						
Electorate: 38,455 Valid: 30,214 Quota: 7,554 Turnout: 78.6%

=== 1944 general election ===
1944 general election: Cork West
Party	Candidate	FPv%	Count					
Party	Candidate	FPv%	1	2	3	4	5	6
Labour	Timothy J. Murphy	15.6	7,764	7,971	8,224	9,865		
Clann na Talmhan	Patrick O'Driscoll	15.3	7,573	7,968	8,113	8,231	8,529	
Fianna Fáil	Seán Buckley	15.2	7,529	7,569	7,980	8,022	8,108	8,282
Fianna Fáil	Timothy O'Sullivan	14.4	7,136	7,226	7,379	7,576	7,862	8,028
Clann na Talmhan	Daniel O'Leary	11.4	5,655	5,671	5,782	5,816	5,913	6,763
Fine Gael	Eamonn O'Neill	10.3	5,125	5,480	5,635	5,738	6,024	8,625
Fine Gael	Timothy O'Donovan	7.9	3,900	4,091	4,154	4,201	4,319	
Labour	Timothy J. Harrington	4.2	2,092	2,161	2,232			
Independent	Tom Hales	2.9	1,444	1,454				
Fine Gael	Michael Sheehy	2.8	1,405					
Electorate: 66,863 Valid: 49,623 Quota: 8,271 Turnout: 74.2%

=== 1943 general election ===
1943 general election: Cork West
Party	Candidate	FPv%	Count							
Party	Candidate	FPv%	1	2	3	4	5	6	7	8
Labour	Timothy J. Murphy	18.1	9,363							
Fianna Fáil	Timothy O'Sullivan	15.4	7,977	8,053	8,156	8,227	8,282	8,501	8,782	
Clann na Talmhan	Patrick O'Driscoll	13.7	7,062	7,118	7,359	8,317	8,362	8,461	8,985	
Fianna Fáil	Seán Buckley	12.8	6,632	6,684	6,699	6,734	7,054	7,538	7,807	7,821
Fine Gael	Timothy O'Donovan	9.4	4,854	4,928	5,197	5,248	5,332	5,502	7,898	8,159
Fine Gael	Daniel O'Leary	8.5	4,414	4,431	4,569	4,906	4,941	5,671	6,485	6,569
Fine Gael	Eamonn O'Neill	8.5	4,378	4,416	4,603	4,687	4,859	5,021		
Labour	Denis Lehane	4.5	2,315	2,480	2,517	2,547	3,949			
Labour	Patrick Crowley	3.8	1,955	2,216	2,272	2,277				
Clann na Talmhan	Michael Twomey	3.1	1,582	1,587	1,604					
Fine Gael	Denis Cronin	2.1	1,104	1,116						
Electorate: 66,863 Valid: 51,636 Quota: 8,607 Turnout: 77.2%

=== 1938 general election ===
1938 general election: Cork West
Party	Candidate	FPv%	Count					
Party	Candidate	FPv%	1	2	3	4	5	6
Fianna Fáil	Seán Buckley	20.1	10,895					
Labour	Timothy J. Murphy	19.3	10,424					
Fianna Fáil	Timothy O'Sullivan	18.5	10,019					
Fine Gael	Timothy O'Donovan	14.5	7,825	8,440	8,973	9,381		
Fine Gael	Daniel O'Leary	12.0	6,504	7,033	7,370	7,500	7,608	8,090
Fine Gael	Eamonn O'Neill	11.7	6,304	6,776	7,166	7,396	7,487	9,109
Fine Gael	Eugene O'Sullivan	3.9	2,124	2,387	2,535	2,770	2,783	
Electorate: 66,266 Valid: 54,095 Quota: 9,016 Turnout: 81.6%

=== 1937 general election ===
1937 general election: Cork West
Party	Candidate	FPv%	Count							
Party	Candidate	FPv%	1	2	3	4	5	6	7	8
Labour	Timothy J. Murphy	22.7	12,179							
Fianna Fáil	Timothy O'Sullivan	14.1	7,538	8,290	8,878	8,948				
Fine Gael	Timothy O'Donovan	12.8	6,846	7,312	7,538	9,082				
Fine Gael	Daniel O'Leary	10.8	5,781	6,018	6,138	6,592	6,625	6,627	7,395	8,486
Fianna Fáil	Daniel Corkery	10.7	5,754	6,520	7,550	7,688	7,690	7,699	7,811	7,820
Fine Gael	Eamonn O'Neill	9.5	5,108	5,336	5,490	6,651	6,752	6,758	10,029	
Fine Gael	William Roycroft	8.4	4,484	4,615	4,653	5,041	5,058	5,060		
Fine Gael	John O'Sullivan	6.9	3,675	3,856	3,954					
Independent	Tom Hales	4.1	2,207	2,696						
Electorate: 67,017 Valid: 53,572 Quota: 8,929 Turnout: 79.9%

=== 1933 general election ===
1933 general election: Cork West
Party	Candidate	FPv%	Count						
Party	Candidate	FPv%	1	2	3	4	5	6	7
Cumann na nGaedheal	James Burke	21.3	9,482						
National Centre Party	Timothy O'Donovan	20.4	9,075						
Labour	Timothy J. Murphy	14.5	6,458	6,656	7,859				
Cumann na nGaedheal	Eamonn O'Neill	13.6	6,067	7,783					
Fianna Fáil	Raphael Keyes	10.9	4,840	4,866	4,952	4,986	5,019	6,055	6,330
Fianna Fáil	Tom Hales	9.0	4,021	4,049	4,214	4,270	4,318	4,911	7,400
Fianna Fáil	Jeremiah Galvin	6.1	2,708	2,769	2,877	2,917	2,935	3,132	
Fianna Fáil	Eugene McCarthy	4.1	1,843	1,880	1,977	2,040	2,108		
Electorate: 54,868 Valid: 44,494 Quota: 7,416 Turnout: 81.1%

=== 1932 general election ===
1932 general election: Cork West
Party	Candidate	FPv%	Count					
Party	Candidate	FPv%	1	2	3	4	5	6
Labour	Timothy J. Murphy	17.7	7,257					
Independent	Jasper Wolfe	14.1	5,757	5,805	5,894	6,855		
Cumann na nGaedheal	Eamonn O'Neill	13.9	5,715	5,793	5,822	8,070		
Farmers' Party	Timothy O'Donovan	13.0	5,310	5,387	5,565	6,455	7,654	
Fianna Fáil	Jeremiah Galvin	12.3	5,060	5,132	5,724	5,883	5,898	5,932
Fianna Fáil	Raphael Keyes	12.2	5,005	5,058	6,352	6,449	6,476	6,536
Cumann na nGaedheal	Timothy Sheehy	10.9	4,476	4,538	4,657			
Fianna Fáil	Eugene McCarthy	5.8	2,393	2,431				
Electorate: 54,238 Valid: 40,973 Quota: 6,829 Turnout: 75.5%

=== September 1927 general election ===
September 1927 general election: Cork West
Party	Candidate	FPv%	Count				
Party	Candidate	FPv%	1	2	3	4	5
Independent	Jasper Wolfe	16.6	6,027	6,085			
Farmers' Party	Timothy O'Donovan	16.3	5,893	5,941	6,177		
Labour	Timothy J. Murphy	15.3	5,561	5,751	8,176		
Fianna Fáil	Thomas Mullins	13.2	4,797	9,004			
Cumann na nGaedheal	Timothy Sheehy	13.2	4,771	4,788	4,863	4,926	4,948
Cumann na nGaedheal	Eamonn O'Neill	12.8	4,623	4,643	4,679	4,804	4,833
Fianna Fáil	Raphael Keyes	12.6	4,585				
Electorate: 56,663 Valid: 36,257 Quota: 6,043 Turnout: 64.0%

=== June 1927 general election ===
June 1927 general election: Cork West
Party	Candidate	FPv%	Count								
Party	Candidate	FPv%	1	2	3	4	5	6	7	8	9
Labour	Timothy J. Murphy	18.7	6,679								
Independent	Jasper Wolfe	12.4	4,422	4,526	4,688	4,785	4,907	5,128	5,296	5,543	5,837
Farmers' Party	Timothy O'Donovan	10.4	3,708	3,788	3,879	3,922	4,045	4,128	4,912	5,054	5,902
Cumann na nGaedheal	Timothy Sheehy	9.0	3,206	3,299	3,529	3,569	4,345	4,458	4,624	4,713	5,999
Fianna Fáil	Thomas Mullins	8.2	2,925	3,001	3,079	3,661	3,722	4,465	4,585	6,328	
Farmers' Party	Joseph McCarthy	7.5	2,693	2,735	2,833	2,974	3,056	3,182	3,636	3,743	3,962
Cumann na nGaedheal	Thomas O'Donovan	6.7	2,404	2,486	2,550	2,594	2,876	2,902	3,032	3,105	
Fianna Fáil	Jeremiah McCarthy	5.9	2,122	2,154	2,192	2,343	2,375	2,782	2,848		
Farmers' Party	Jeremiah O'Sullivan	5.0	1,801	1,820	1,850	1,897	2,043	2,093			
Fianna Fáil	George Ross	4.9	1,739	1,790	1,817	1,962	1,994				
Cumann na nGaedheal	John Prior	4.7	1,685	1,735	1,779	1,801					
Sinn Féin	Seán Buckley	3.8	1,349	1,396	1,427						
Independent	Cornelius O'Donovan	2.7	947	1,003							
Electorate: 56,663 Valid: 35,680 Quota: 5,947 Turnout: 63.0%

=== 1923 general election ===
There is no record of Buckley's surplus having been distributed, even though it was greater than the difference between the votes of Murphy and Kelly.

1923 general election: Cork West
Party	Candidate	FPv%	Count									
Party	Candidate	FPv%	1	2	3	4	5	6	7	8	9	10
Cumann na nGaedheal	Cornelius Connolly	14.9	4,430	4,482	4,601	4,626	4,813	5,264				
Labour	Timothy J. Murphy	11.8	3,517	3,600	3,630	3,697	3,773	3,987	3,998	4,191	4,290	4,405
Cumann na nGaedheal	John Prior	11.0	3,257	3,349	3,394	3,398	3,449	3,736	3,915	4,186	4,595	4,615
Republican	Seán Buckley	10.9	3,237	3,325	3,355	3,629	3,720	3,763	3,769	3,815	3,867	5,866
Farmers' Party	Timothy O'Donovan	8.3	2,473	2,535	3,036	3,090	3,410	3,543	3,563	3,789	4,777	4,861
Cumann na nGaedheal	Robert Kelly	8.3	2,469	2,548	2,609	2,635	2,681	2,794	2,870	3,258	3,368	3,505
Republican	Maurice Donegan	5.9	1,741	1,767	1,789	2,500	2,549	2,562	2,565	2,649	2,682	
Farmers' Party	Michael Scully	4.9	1,460	1,477	1,604	1,617	1,871	1,927	1,932	2,078		
Independent	Daniel O'Leary	4.8	1,427	1,445	1,483	1,508	1,569	1,665	1,675			
Cumann na nGaedheal	Daniel McCarthy	4.5	1,347	1,396	1,418	1,441	1,494					
National Democratic	Joseph O'Mahony	4.5	1,336	1,350	1,393	1,410						
Republican	John Lehane	4.2	1,240	1,266	1,296							
Farmers' Party	Daniel Minihane	3.6	1,074	1,114								
Independent	William Hales	1.7	510									
Independent	David Connor	0.7	205									
Electorate: 59,500 Valid: 29,723 Quota: 4,954 Turnout: 50.0%

== See also ==
- Dáil constituencies
- Politics of the Republic of Ireland
- Historic Dáil constituencies
- Elections in the Republic of Ireland
