= Seán Buckley (politician) =

Irish politician (1873–1963)

Teachta Dála
- In office February 1948 – May 1954
- Constituency: Cork South
- In office June 1938 – February 1948
- In office August 1923 – June 1927
- Constituency: Cork West

Personal details
- Born: 1873
- Died: 1 December 1963 (aged 89–90)
- Party: Fianna Fáil; Sinn Féin

Seán Buckley (1873 – 1 December 1963) was a revolutionary and Irish politician.

== Early life and revolutionary period ==
Buckley joined the Irish Volunteers in 1915. He was arrested on 19 August 1918, charged with sedition, sentenced to two years imprisonment and imprisoned in Cork Jail and Belfast Jail until 20 December 1918. During the Irish War of Independence, Buckley served as Brigade Intelligence Officer of 3 Cork Brigade, Irish Republican Army (IRA).

Taking the anti-Treaty side in the Irish Civil War, he was active in County Cork and captured on 12 September 1922 by National forces. Buckley was interned in several camps and prisons until December 1923. Buckley was later awarded a pension by the Irish government under the Military Service Pensions Act, 1934 for his service with the Irish Volunteers and the IRA between 1917 and 1923.

== Politics ==
He was elected to Dáil Éireann as a Sinn Féin Teachta Dála (TD) for the Cork West constituency at the 1923 general election. He lost his seat at the June 1927 general election.

He next stood for election at the 1938 general election and was elected as a Fianna Fáil TD. He was re-elected at each general election until he retired from politics at the 1954 general election.

Dáil	Election	Deputy (Party)	Deputy (Party)	Deputy (Party)	Deputy (Party)	Deputy (Party)
4th	1923	Timothy J. Murphy (Lab)	Seán Buckley (Rep)	Cornelius Connolly (CnaG)	John Prior (CnaG)	Timothy O'Donovan (FP)
5th	1927 (Jun)	Timothy J. Murphy (Lab)	Thomas Mullins (FF)	Timothy Sheehy (CnaG)	Jasper Wolfe (Ind.)	Timothy O'Donovan (FP)
6th	1927 (Sep)	Timothy J. Murphy (Lab)	Thomas Mullins (FF)	Timothy Sheehy (CnaG)	Jasper Wolfe (Ind.)	Timothy O'Donovan (FP)
7th	1932	Timothy J. Murphy (Lab)	Raphael Keyes (FF)	Eamonn O'Neill (CnaG)	Jasper Wolfe (Ind.)	Timothy O'Donovan (FP)
8th	1933	Timothy J. Murphy (Lab)	Tom Hales (FF)	Eamonn O'Neill (CnaG)	James Burke (CnaG)	Timothy O'Donovan (NCP)
9th	1937	Timothy J. Murphy (Lab)	Timothy O'Sullivan (FF)	Daniel O'Leary (FG)	Eamonn O'Neill (FG)	Timothy O'Donovan (FG)
10th	1938	Timothy J. Murphy (Lab)	Timothy O'Sullivan (FF)	Seán Buckley (FF)	Eamonn O'Neill (FG)	Timothy O'Donovan (FG)
11th	1943	Timothy J. Murphy (Lab)	Timothy O'Sullivan (FF)	Seán Buckley (FF)	Patrick O'Driscoll (Ind.)	Timothy O'Donovan (FG)
12th	1944	Timothy J. Murphy (Lab)	Timothy O'Sullivan (FF)	Seán Buckley (FF)	Patrick O'Driscoll (Ind.)	Eamonn O'Neill (FG)
13th	1948	Timothy J. Murphy (Lab)	Timothy O'Sullivan (FF)	Seán Collins (FG)	3 seats 1948–1961	
13th	1949 by-election	William J. Murphy (Lab)	Timothy O'Sullivan (FF)	Seán Collins (FG)	3 seats 1948–1961	
14th	1951	Michael Pat Murphy (Lab)	Timothy O'Sullivan (FF)	Seán Collins (FG)	3 seats 1948–1961	
15th	1954	Michael Pat Murphy (Lab)	Edward Cotter (FF)	Seán Collins (FG)	3 seats 1948–1961	
16th	1957	Michael Pat Murphy (Lab)	Edward Cotter (FF)	Florence Wycherley (Ind.)	3 seats 1948–1961	
17th	1961	Constituency abolished. See Cork South-West				

Dáil	Election	Deputy (Party)	Deputy (Party)	Deputy (Party)
13th	1948	Dan Desmond (Lab)	Seán Buckley (FF)	Patrick Lehane (CnaT)
14th	1951	Dan Desmond (Lab)	Seán Buckley (FF)	Patrick Lehane (Ind.)
15th	1954	Dan Desmond (Lab)	Seán McCarthy (FF)	Tadhg Manley (FG)
16th	1957	Dan Desmond (Lab)	Seán McCarthy (FF)	Tadhg Manley (FG)
17th	1961	Constituency abolished		
