= John Pryor =

John Pryor may refer to:

- John Pryor (soldier) (1750–1823), Continental Army officer
- John Benjamin Pryor (1812–1890), racehorse trainer
- John Arthur Pryor (1884–?), British officer and aristocrat

== See also ==
- John Prior (disambiguation)
