= Timothy Sheehy =

Timothy Sheehy may refer to:

- Tim Sheehy (ice hockey) (born 1948), American ice hockey player
- Tim Sheehy (born 1985), American politician
- Timothy Sheehy (Cork politician) (1855–1938), Irish Cumann na nGaedhael politician, represented Cork West
- Timothy Sheehy (Tipperary politician) (1895–1968), Irish Fianna Fáil politician, represented Tipperary
