= Eamonn O'Neill =

Irish politician (1882–1954)

Leas-Cheann Comhairle of Dáil Éireann
- In office 31 May 1939 – 31 May 1943
- Ceann Comhairle: Frank Fahy
- Preceded by: Fionán Lynch
- Succeeded by: Daniel McMenamin

Teachta Dála
- In office May 1944 – February 1948
- In office February 1932 – June 1943
- Constituency: Cork West

Personal details
- Born: 1882 Kinsale, County Cork, Ireland
- Died: 3 November 1954 (aged 71–72) County Cork, Ireland
- Party: Fine Gael; Cumann na nGaedheal
- Education: Royal University of Ireland

Eamonn O'Neill (1882 – 3 November 1954) was an Irish businessman, Cumann na nGaedheal and later Fine Gael politician.

Born in Kinsale in 1882, O'Neill was the son of James O'Neill, a Kinsale merchant and member of the first Cork County Council. He was educated at the Christian Brothers School in Youghal, the Presentation Brothers School in Kinsale, Mungret College, and the Royal University of Ireland, where he was awarded a B.A. degree in 1901.

He inherited his father's business in Kinsale. He was one of the founders of the Irish Master Bakers' Association. He campaigned to have electricity brought to Kinsale, and succeeded in 1920. From 1925 to 1928 he served on Cork County Council. He and Rev. Patrick MacSwiney, curate in Kinsale from 1927 to 1940, supported each other in their endeavours to improve the economic, social and cultural situation in the depressed town.

O'Neill was an unsuccessful Cumann na nGaedheal candidate at the September 1927 general election in the 5-seat Cork West constituency. He stood again at the next opportunity, at the 1932 general election, and was elected as a Teachta Dála (TD) for Cork West. He was re-elected at the next three general elections, before losing his seat at the 1943 general election to the Clann na Talmhan candidate Patrick O'Driscoll. He served as Leas-Cheann Comhairle from May 1939 to May 1943.

He was re-elected a year later, at the 1944 general election, unseating his Fine Gael colleague Timothy O'Donovan. The Cork West constituency was reduced to a 3-seater at the 1948 general election, and O'Neill stood in the Cork South constituency but was not re-elected. He did not contest any further elections.

He was an active sportsman; he donated the O'Neill Cup for junior rugby clubs in County Cork. He was also an accomplished singer and musician and a supporter of the arts in Cork.

Dáil	Election	Deputy (Party)	Deputy (Party)	Deputy (Party)	Deputy (Party)	Deputy (Party)
4th	1923	Timothy J. Murphy (Lab)	Seán Buckley (Rep)	Cornelius Connolly (CnaG)	John Prior (CnaG)	Timothy O'Donovan (FP)
5th	1927 (Jun)	Timothy J. Murphy (Lab)	Thomas Mullins (FF)	Timothy Sheehy (CnaG)	Jasper Wolfe (Ind.)	Timothy O'Donovan (FP)
6th	1927 (Sep)	Timothy J. Murphy (Lab)	Thomas Mullins (FF)	Timothy Sheehy (CnaG)	Jasper Wolfe (Ind.)	Timothy O'Donovan (FP)
7th	1932	Timothy J. Murphy (Lab)	Raphael Keyes (FF)	Eamonn O'Neill (CnaG)	Jasper Wolfe (Ind.)	Timothy O'Donovan (FP)
8th	1933	Timothy J. Murphy (Lab)	Tom Hales (FF)	Eamonn O'Neill (CnaG)	James Burke (CnaG)	Timothy O'Donovan (NCP)
9th	1937	Timothy J. Murphy (Lab)	Timothy O'Sullivan (FF)	Daniel O'Leary (FG)	Eamonn O'Neill (FG)	Timothy O'Donovan (FG)
10th	1938	Timothy J. Murphy (Lab)	Timothy O'Sullivan (FF)	Seán Buckley (FF)	Eamonn O'Neill (FG)	Timothy O'Donovan (FG)
11th	1943	Timothy J. Murphy (Lab)	Timothy O'Sullivan (FF)	Seán Buckley (FF)	Patrick O'Driscoll (Ind.)	Timothy O'Donovan (FG)
12th	1944	Timothy J. Murphy (Lab)	Timothy O'Sullivan (FF)	Seán Buckley (FF)	Patrick O'Driscoll (Ind.)	Eamonn O'Neill (FG)
13th	1948	Timothy J. Murphy (Lab)	Timothy O'Sullivan (FF)	Seán Collins (FG)	3 seats 1948–1961	
13th	1949 by-election	William J. Murphy (Lab)	Timothy O'Sullivan (FF)	Seán Collins (FG)	3 seats 1948–1961	
14th	1951	Michael Pat Murphy (Lab)	Timothy O'Sullivan (FF)	Seán Collins (FG)	3 seats 1948–1961	
15th	1954	Michael Pat Murphy (Lab)	Edward Cotter (FF)	Seán Collins (FG)	3 seats 1948–1961	
16th	1957	Michael Pat Murphy (Lab)	Edward Cotter (FF)	Florence Wycherley (Ind.)	3 seats 1948–1961	
17th	1961	Constituency abolished. See Cork South-West				
