= Thomas Mullins (Irish politician) =

American-born Irish politician (1903–1978)

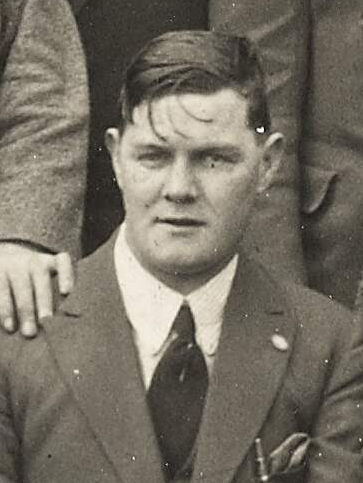
- Mullins in 1927

Senator
- In office 22 May 1957 – 1 June 1973
- Constituency: Nominated by the Taoiseach

Teachta Dála
- In office June 1927 – February 1932
- Constituency: Cork West

Cork County Councillor
- In office 1928–1934
- Constituency: Bandon

Personal details
- Born: 12 February 1903 New Rochelle, New York, US
- Died: 2 November 1978 (aged 75) Dublin, Ireland
- Party: Fianna Fáil
- Spouse: Brigid O'Brien (m. 1935)
- Education: National University of Ireland

Military service
- Branch/service: Fianna Éireann; Irish Republican Army; Anti-Treaty IRA
- Unit: A Company, 5th Battalion, Third Cork Brigade
- Battles/wars: Irish War of Independence; Irish Civil War

Thomas Lincoln Joseph Mullins (12 February 1903 – 2 November 1978) was an American-born Irish Fianna Fáil politician.

== Early life ==
He was born 12 February 1903 in New Rochelle, New York, the only child of Martin and Catherine Mullins originally from Cork and Galway respectively. Born on Abraham Lincoln's birthday, he was named after the US president. The family moved to County Cork in 1914, and he was educated at Presentation Brothers School, Kinsale, and St. Enda's School, Rathfarnham. He later graduated with an MA (National University of Ireland) and obtained a higher diploma in education.

== Fianna Éireann and the IRA ==
He joined Fianna Éireann and later the Irish Republican Army, serving in A Company, 5th Battalion, 3rd Cork Brigade. He was arrested in 1920 along with his father, and was imprisoned in Spike Island, Wormwood Scrubs, and Ballykinler until the end of 1921. Opposed to the Anglo-Irish Treaty, he joined the anti-Treaty IRA faction and was arrested and imprisoned in Mountjoy, where he went on hunger strike for forty-one days in October 1923.

== Politics ==
A close friend of Éamon de Valera, he was involved in the foundation of Fianna Fáil in 1926, travelling around west Cork along with de Valera to organise forty-five party branches. Mullins was first elected to Dáil Éireann as a Fianna Fáil Teachta Dála (TD) for the Cork West constituency at the June 1927 general election and was re-elected at the September 1927 general election. He did not contest the 1932 general election. He was a member of Cork County Council representing the Bandon electoral area from 1928 to 1934. A journalist, he worked for The Irish Press from 1941 to 1944.

He was defeated in the Carlow–Kildare constituency at the 1943 and 1944 general elections, and by Seán MacBride at the 1947 Dublin County by-election, he did not seek elected office again, choosing to concentrate on his duties as general secretary of Fianna Fáil, a post he held from 1945 to 1973.

In 1957 he was nominated by the Taoiseach Éamon de Valera to the 9th Seanad. Mullins was re-nominated to the 10th, 11th and 12th Seanad. He served as Leader of the Seanad from 1957 to 1973.

Dáil	Election	Deputy (Party)	Deputy (Party)	Deputy (Party)	Deputy (Party)	Deputy (Party)
4th	1923	Timothy J. Murphy (Lab)	Seán Buckley (Rep)	Cornelius Connolly (CnaG)	John Prior (CnaG)	Timothy O'Donovan (FP)
5th	1927 (Jun)	Timothy J. Murphy (Lab)	Thomas Mullins (FF)	Timothy Sheehy (CnaG)	Jasper Wolfe (Ind.)	Timothy O'Donovan (FP)
6th	1927 (Sep)	Timothy J. Murphy (Lab)	Thomas Mullins (FF)	Timothy Sheehy (CnaG)	Jasper Wolfe (Ind.)	Timothy O'Donovan (FP)
7th	1932	Timothy J. Murphy (Lab)	Raphael Keyes (FF)	Eamonn O'Neill (CnaG)	Jasper Wolfe (Ind.)	Timothy O'Donovan (FP)
8th	1933	Timothy J. Murphy (Lab)	Tom Hales (FF)	Eamonn O'Neill (CnaG)	James Burke (CnaG)	Timothy O'Donovan (NCP)
9th	1937	Timothy J. Murphy (Lab)	Timothy O'Sullivan (FF)	Daniel O'Leary (FG)	Eamonn O'Neill (FG)	Timothy O'Donovan (FG)
10th	1938	Timothy J. Murphy (Lab)	Timothy O'Sullivan (FF)	Seán Buckley (FF)	Eamonn O'Neill (FG)	Timothy O'Donovan (FG)
11th	1943	Timothy J. Murphy (Lab)	Timothy O'Sullivan (FF)	Seán Buckley (FF)	Patrick O'Driscoll (Ind.)	Timothy O'Donovan (FG)
12th	1944	Timothy J. Murphy (Lab)	Timothy O'Sullivan (FF)	Seán Buckley (FF)	Patrick O'Driscoll (Ind.)	Eamonn O'Neill (FG)
13th	1948	Timothy J. Murphy (Lab)	Timothy O'Sullivan (FF)	Seán Collins (FG)	3 seats 1948–1961	
13th	1949 by-election	William J. Murphy (Lab)	Timothy O'Sullivan (FF)	Seán Collins (FG)	3 seats 1948–1961	
14th	1951	Michael Pat Murphy (Lab)	Timothy O'Sullivan (FF)	Seán Collins (FG)	3 seats 1948–1961	
15th	1954	Michael Pat Murphy (Lab)	Edward Cotter (FF)	Seán Collins (FG)	3 seats 1948–1961	
16th	1957	Michael Pat Murphy (Lab)	Edward Cotter (FF)	Florence Wycherley (Ind.)	3 seats 1948–1961	
17th	1961	Constituency abolished. See Cork South-West				
