= Raphael Keyes =

Irish politician

Senator
- In office 2 January 1934 – 29 May 1936

Teachta Dála
- In office February 1932 – January 1933
- Constituency: Cork West

Personal details
- Born: Cork, Ireland
- Party: Fianna Fáil

Raphael Patrick Keyes was an Irish Fianna Fáil politician.

He was born in Cork, and was a cinema proprietor when elected to the Oireachtas. During the Irish War of Independence he was captain of the Bantry company of the fifth battalion of Irish Republican Army (IRA) in West Cork.

He was first elected to Dáil Éireann as a Fianna Fáil Teachta Dála (TD) for the Cork West constituency at the 1932 general election. He was lost his seat at the 1933 general election but was elected to the Seanad at a by-election on 2 January 1934.

Dáil	Election	Deputy (Party)	Deputy (Party)	Deputy (Party)	Deputy (Party)	Deputy (Party)
4th	1923	Timothy J. Murphy (Lab)	Seán Buckley (Rep)	Cornelius Connolly (CnaG)	John Prior (CnaG)	Timothy O'Donovan (FP)
5th	1927 (Jun)	Timothy J. Murphy (Lab)	Thomas Mullins (FF)	Timothy Sheehy (CnaG)	Jasper Wolfe (Ind.)	Timothy O'Donovan (FP)
6th	1927 (Sep)	Timothy J. Murphy (Lab)	Thomas Mullins (FF)	Timothy Sheehy (CnaG)	Jasper Wolfe (Ind.)	Timothy O'Donovan (FP)
7th	1932	Timothy J. Murphy (Lab)	Raphael Keyes (FF)	Eamonn O'Neill (CnaG)	Jasper Wolfe (Ind.)	Timothy O'Donovan (FP)
8th	1933	Timothy J. Murphy (Lab)	Tom Hales (FF)	Eamonn O'Neill (CnaG)	James Burke (CnaG)	Timothy O'Donovan (NCP)
9th	1937	Timothy J. Murphy (Lab)	Timothy O'Sullivan (FF)	Daniel O'Leary (FG)	Eamonn O'Neill (FG)	Timothy O'Donovan (FG)
10th	1938	Timothy J. Murphy (Lab)	Timothy O'Sullivan (FF)	Seán Buckley (FF)	Eamonn O'Neill (FG)	Timothy O'Donovan (FG)
11th	1943	Timothy J. Murphy (Lab)	Timothy O'Sullivan (FF)	Seán Buckley (FF)	Patrick O'Driscoll (Ind.)	Timothy O'Donovan (FG)
12th	1944	Timothy J. Murphy (Lab)	Timothy O'Sullivan (FF)	Seán Buckley (FF)	Patrick O'Driscoll (Ind.)	Eamonn O'Neill (FG)
13th	1948	Timothy J. Murphy (Lab)	Timothy O'Sullivan (FF)	Seán Collins (FG)	3 seats 1948–1961	
13th	1949 by-election	William J. Murphy (Lab)	Timothy O'Sullivan (FF)	Seán Collins (FG)	3 seats 1948–1961	
14th	1951	Michael Pat Murphy (Lab)	Timothy O'Sullivan (FF)	Seán Collins (FG)	3 seats 1948–1961	
15th	1954	Michael Pat Murphy (Lab)	Edward Cotter (FF)	Seán Collins (FG)	3 seats 1948–1961	
16th	1957	Michael Pat Murphy (Lab)	Edward Cotter (FF)	Florence Wycherley (Ind.)	3 seats 1948–1961	
17th	1961	Constituency abolished. See Cork South-West				
