= Daniel O'Leary (Fine Gael politician) =

Irish politician (1877–1951)

Teachta Dála
- In office July 1937 – June 1938
- Constituency: Cork West
- In office September 1927 – July 1937
- Constituency: Cork North

Personal details
- Born: 1 September 1877 County Cork, Ireland
- Died: 31 March 1951 (aged 73) County Cork, Ireland
- Party: Fine Gael; Cumann na nGaedheal

Daniel O'Leary (1 September 1877 – 31 March 1951) was an Irish politician, farmer and vintner. He was an unsuccessful independent candidate at the 1923 general election, but was elected to Dáil Éireann as a Cumann na nGaedheal Teachta Dála (TD) for the Cork North constituency at the September 1927 general election.

He was re-elected at the 1932 and 1933 general elections. At the 1937 general election, he was elected as a Fine Gael TD for the Cork West constituency. He lost his seat at the 1938 general election, and was an unsuccessful candidate at the 1943 and 1944 general elections.

Dáil	Election	Deputy (Party)	Deputy (Party)	Deputy (Party)	Deputy (Party)
4th	1923	Daniel Corkery (Rep)	Daniel Vaughan (FP)	Thomas Nagle (Lab)	3 seats 1923–1937
5th	1927 (Jun)	Daniel Corkery (Ind.)	Daniel Vaughan (FP)	Timothy Quill (Lab)	3 seats 1923–1937
6th	1927 (Sep)	Daniel Corkery (FF)	Daniel Vaughan (FP)	Daniel O'Leary (CnaG)	3 seats 1923–1937
7th	1932	Seán Moylan (FF)	Daniel Vaughan (FP)	Daniel O'Leary (CnaG)	3 seats 1923–1937
8th	1933	Seán Moylan (FF)	Daniel Corkery (FF)	Daniel O'Leary (CnaG)	3 seats 1923–1937
9th	1937	Seán Moylan (FF)	Patrick Daly (FG)	Timothy Linehan (FG)	Con Meaney (FF)
10th	1938	Seán Moylan (FF)	Patrick Daly (FG)	Timothy Linehan (FG)	Con Meaney (FF)
11th	1943	Seán Moylan (FF)	Patrick Halliden (CnaT)	Timothy Linehan (FG)	Leo Skinner (FF)
12th	1944	Seán Moylan (FF)	Patrick Halliden (CnaT)	Patrick McAuliffe (Lab)	Leo Skinner (FF)
13th	1948	Seán Moylan (FF)	Patrick Halliden (CnaT)	Patrick McAuliffe (Lab)	3 seats 1948–1961
14th	1951	Seán Moylan (FF)	Denis O'Sullivan (FG)	Patrick McAuliffe (Lab)	3 seats 1948–1961
15th	1954	Seán Moylan (FF)	Denis O'Sullivan (FG)	Patrick McAuliffe (Lab)	3 seats 1948–1961
16th	1957	Batt Donegan (FF)	Denis O'Sullivan (FG)	Patrick McAuliffe (Lab)	3 seats 1948–1961
17th	1961	Constituency abolished. See Cork North-East and Cork Mid			

Dáil	Election	Deputy (Party)	Deputy (Party)	Deputy (Party)	Deputy (Party)	Deputy (Party)
4th	1923	Timothy J. Murphy (Lab)	Seán Buckley (Rep)	Cornelius Connolly (CnaG)	John Prior (CnaG)	Timothy O'Donovan (FP)
5th	1927 (Jun)	Timothy J. Murphy (Lab)	Thomas Mullins (FF)	Timothy Sheehy (CnaG)	Jasper Wolfe (Ind.)	Timothy O'Donovan (FP)
6th	1927 (Sep)	Timothy J. Murphy (Lab)	Thomas Mullins (FF)	Timothy Sheehy (CnaG)	Jasper Wolfe (Ind.)	Timothy O'Donovan (FP)
7th	1932	Timothy J. Murphy (Lab)	Raphael Keyes (FF)	Eamonn O'Neill (CnaG)	Jasper Wolfe (Ind.)	Timothy O'Donovan (FP)
8th	1933	Timothy J. Murphy (Lab)	Tom Hales (FF)	Eamonn O'Neill (CnaG)	James Burke (CnaG)	Timothy O'Donovan (NCP)
9th	1937	Timothy J. Murphy (Lab)	Timothy O'Sullivan (FF)	Daniel O'Leary (FG)	Eamonn O'Neill (FG)	Timothy O'Donovan (FG)
10th	1938	Timothy J. Murphy (Lab)	Timothy O'Sullivan (FF)	Seán Buckley (FF)	Eamonn O'Neill (FG)	Timothy O'Donovan (FG)
11th	1943	Timothy J. Murphy (Lab)	Timothy O'Sullivan (FF)	Seán Buckley (FF)	Patrick O'Driscoll (Ind.)	Timothy O'Donovan (FG)
12th	1944	Timothy J. Murphy (Lab)	Timothy O'Sullivan (FF)	Seán Buckley (FF)	Patrick O'Driscoll (Ind.)	Eamonn O'Neill (FG)
13th	1948	Timothy J. Murphy (Lab)	Timothy O'Sullivan (FF)	Seán Collins (FG)	3 seats 1948–1961	
13th	1949 by-election	William J. Murphy (Lab)	Timothy O'Sullivan (FF)	Seán Collins (FG)	3 seats 1948–1961	
14th	1951	Michael Pat Murphy (Lab)	Timothy O'Sullivan (FF)	Seán Collins (FG)	3 seats 1948–1961	
15th	1954	Michael Pat Murphy (Lab)	Edward Cotter (FF)	Seán Collins (FG)	3 seats 1948–1961	
16th	1957	Michael Pat Murphy (Lab)	Edward Cotter (FF)	Florence Wycherley (Ind.)	3 seats 1948–1961	
17th	1961	Constituency abolished. See Cork South-West				
