= Jasper Wolfe =

Irish politician and lawyer (1872–1952)

Teachta Dála
- In office June 1927 – February 1932
- Constituency: Cork West

Personal details
- Born: 3 August 1872 Skibbereen, County Cork, Ireland
- Died: 27 August 1952 (aged 80) County Cork, Ireland
- Party: Independent

Jasper Travers Wolfe (3 August 1872 – 27 August 1952) was an Irish Independent politician who served as a Teachta Dála (TD) for Cork West from 1927 to 1933.

He was born into a Methodist family the son of William J. Wolfe. He was educated at Bishop's School, Skibbereen and was admitted as a solicitor in 1893. He obtained first place in his final exams and was awarded the Findlater Scholarship. He was a member of Skibbereen Urban District Council for a number of years. He was crown prosecutor in Cork city for a period and for the West Riding of County Cork from 1916 to 1923. He was the first Cork man to hold the Presidency of the Incorporated Law Society of Ireland.

Wolfe was elected to Dáil Éireann on his first attempt, at the June 1927 general election, and took his seat in the short-lived 5th Dáil. He was re-elected at the September 1927 general election and again at the 1932 general election, but did not contest the 1933 general election.

Wolfe was a solicitor who also owned the Cork County Eagle and Munster Advertiser newspaper. This was a successor to the Skibbereen Eagle, which in an editorial in 1897 had famously warned the Tsar of Russia about expansionist aims towards China, declaring that the Skibbereen Eagle had "got its eye on the Tsar".

A book about Wolfe titled Jasper Wolfe of Skibbereen was written by Jasper Ungoed-Thomas, grandson of Jasper Wolfe, and tells the story of his life, set against the backdrop of the partition of Ireland and the emergent new political order.

In 1894 Wolfe founded Wolfe & Co. Solicitors, which is still operating in Market Street, Skibbereen, County Cork. He died at his residence, "Norton", Skibbereen, and is buried in Aughadown Cemetery.

== Sources ==
- Willie Kingston: From Victorian Boyhood to the Troubles: A Skibbereen Memoir, Skibbereen Historical Journal Vol 1 2005, extracts edited by his niece Daisy Swanton and Jasper Ungoed-Thomas, grandson of Jasper Wolfe, and Vol 2.
- Tim Cadogan and Jeremiah Falvey, A Biographical Dictionary of Cork, 2006, Four Courts Press ISBN 1-84682-030-8

Dáil	Election	Deputy (Party)	Deputy (Party)	Deputy (Party)	Deputy (Party)	Deputy (Party)
4th	1923	Timothy J. Murphy (Lab)	Seán Buckley (Rep)	Cornelius Connolly (CnaG)	John Prior (CnaG)	Timothy O'Donovan (FP)
5th	1927 (Jun)	Timothy J. Murphy (Lab)	Thomas Mullins (FF)	Timothy Sheehy (CnaG)	Jasper Wolfe (Ind.)	Timothy O'Donovan (FP)
6th	1927 (Sep)	Timothy J. Murphy (Lab)	Thomas Mullins (FF)	Timothy Sheehy (CnaG)	Jasper Wolfe (Ind.)	Timothy O'Donovan (FP)
7th	1932	Timothy J. Murphy (Lab)	Raphael Keyes (FF)	Eamonn O'Neill (CnaG)	Jasper Wolfe (Ind.)	Timothy O'Donovan (FP)
8th	1933	Timothy J. Murphy (Lab)	Tom Hales (FF)	Eamonn O'Neill (CnaG)	James Burke (CnaG)	Timothy O'Donovan (NCP)
9th	1937	Timothy J. Murphy (Lab)	Timothy O'Sullivan (FF)	Daniel O'Leary (FG)	Eamonn O'Neill (FG)	Timothy O'Donovan (FG)
10th	1938	Timothy J. Murphy (Lab)	Timothy O'Sullivan (FF)	Seán Buckley (FF)	Eamonn O'Neill (FG)	Timothy O'Donovan (FG)
11th	1943	Timothy J. Murphy (Lab)	Timothy O'Sullivan (FF)	Seán Buckley (FF)	Patrick O'Driscoll (Ind.)	Timothy O'Donovan (FG)
12th	1944	Timothy J. Murphy (Lab)	Timothy O'Sullivan (FF)	Seán Buckley (FF)	Patrick O'Driscoll (Ind.)	Eamonn O'Neill (FG)
13th	1948	Timothy J. Murphy (Lab)	Timothy O'Sullivan (FF)	Seán Collins (FG)	3 seats 1948–1961	
13th	1949 by-election	William J. Murphy (Lab)	Timothy O'Sullivan (FF)	Seán Collins (FG)	3 seats 1948–1961	
14th	1951	Michael Pat Murphy (Lab)	Timothy O'Sullivan (FF)	Seán Collins (FG)	3 seats 1948–1961	
15th	1954	Michael Pat Murphy (Lab)	Edward Cotter (FF)	Seán Collins (FG)	3 seats 1948–1961	
16th	1957	Michael Pat Murphy (Lab)	Edward Cotter (FF)	Florence Wycherley (Ind.)	3 seats 1948–1961	
17th	1961	Constituency abolished. See Cork South-West				
