= National Democratic Party (Ireland) =

Defunct Irish political party

- Founded: 1923
- Dissolved: 1923
- Ideology: Agrarianism; Land reform

The National Democratic Party was a minor party in the Irish Free State representing small farming interests.

The Farmers' Party was a significant force in early 1920s politics in Ireland, associated with middle-class farmers with larger holdings. Small-scale farmers who felt that the Farmers' Party did not represent them founded the National Democratic Party early in 1923, aiming to also attract support from poor labourers and other individuals in rural areas.

The party announced that it would stand fifteen candidates at the 1923 general election, It actually stood four candidates: Joseph O'Mahony in Cork West, Joseph Delaney and Patrick Belton in Laois–Offaly, and Seán O'Farrell in Longford–Westmeath. They took 4,966 votes between them, and none were elected. The party disbanded soon after the election.
