= Timothy O'Donovan =

Irish politician (1881–1957)

Cathaoirleach of Seanad Éireann
- In office 21 April 1948 – 14 August 1951
- Preceded by: Seán Goulding
- Succeeded by: Liam Ó Buachalla

Senator
- In office 18 August 1944 – 22 July 1954
- Constituency: Agricultural Panel

Teachta Dála
- In office August 1923 – May 1944
- Constituency: Cork West

Personal details
- Born: 4 April 1881 County Cork, Ireland
- Died: 28 June 1957 (aged 76) County Cork, Ireland
- Party: Fine Gael
- Other political affiliations: Farmers' Party; National Centre Party

Timothy Joseph O'Donovan (4 April 1881 – 28 June 1957) was a Farmers' Party and Fine Gael politician from County Cork in Ireland. He was a Teachta Dála (TD) from 1923 to 1944, then a senator from 1944 until 1954, serving as Cathaoirleach of Seanad Éireann from 1948 to 1951.

O'Donovan was elected at the 1923 general election to the 4th Dáil as a Farmers' Party TD for the Cork West constituency. He was re-elected at seven further general elections until his defeat at the 1944 general election to the 12th Dáil, after several changes of party affiliation. After the demise of the Farmers' Party in the 1920s, he was re-elected in 1933 as a National Centre Party TD, and when the National Party merged with Cumann na nGaedheal to form Fine Gael, he joined the new party.

After the loss of his Dáil seat in 1944, he was elected at the subsequent Seanad Éireann election to the 5th Seanad, on the Agricultural Panel. He was re-elected in 1948 to the 6th Seanad, serving as Cathaoirleach (chairperson) of the Seanad from 1948 to 1951. He died in 1957.

Oireachtas
Preceded by Seán Goulding	Cathaoirleach of Seanad Éireann; 1948–1951	Succeeded by Liam Ó Buachalla

Dáil	Election	Deputy (Party)	Deputy (Party)	Deputy (Party)	Deputy (Party)	Deputy (Party)
4th	1923	Timothy J. Murphy (Lab)	Seán Buckley (Rep)	Cornelius Connolly (CnaG)	John Prior (CnaG)	Timothy O'Donovan (FP)
5th	1927 (Jun)	Timothy J. Murphy (Lab)	Thomas Mullins (FF)	Timothy Sheehy (CnaG)	Jasper Wolfe (Ind.)	Timothy O'Donovan (FP)
6th	1927 (Sep)	Timothy J. Murphy (Lab)	Thomas Mullins (FF)	Timothy Sheehy (CnaG)	Jasper Wolfe (Ind.)	Timothy O'Donovan (FP)
7th	1932	Timothy J. Murphy (Lab)	Raphael Keyes (FF)	Eamonn O'Neill (CnaG)	Jasper Wolfe (Ind.)	Timothy O'Donovan (FP)
8th	1933	Timothy J. Murphy (Lab)	Tom Hales (FF)	Eamonn O'Neill (CnaG)	James Burke (CnaG)	Timothy O'Donovan (NCP)
9th	1937	Timothy J. Murphy (Lab)	Timothy O'Sullivan (FF)	Daniel O'Leary (FG)	Eamonn O'Neill (FG)	Timothy O'Donovan (FG)
10th	1938	Timothy J. Murphy (Lab)	Timothy O'Sullivan (FF)	Seán Buckley (FF)	Eamonn O'Neill (FG)	Timothy O'Donovan (FG)
11th	1943	Timothy J. Murphy (Lab)	Timothy O'Sullivan (FF)	Seán Buckley (FF)	Patrick O'Driscoll (Ind.)	Timothy O'Donovan (FG)
12th	1944	Timothy J. Murphy (Lab)	Timothy O'Sullivan (FF)	Seán Buckley (FF)	Patrick O'Driscoll (Ind.)	Eamonn O'Neill (FG)
13th	1948	Timothy J. Murphy (Lab)	Timothy O'Sullivan (FF)	Seán Collins (FG)	3 seats 1948–1961	
13th	1949 by-election	William J. Murphy (Lab)	Timothy O'Sullivan (FF)	Seán Collins (FG)	3 seats 1948–1961	
14th	1951	Michael Pat Murphy (Lab)	Timothy O'Sullivan (FF)	Seán Collins (FG)	3 seats 1948–1961	
15th	1954	Michael Pat Murphy (Lab)	Edward Cotter (FF)	Seán Collins (FG)	3 seats 1948–1961	
16th	1957	Michael Pat Murphy (Lab)	Edward Cotter (FF)	Florence Wycherley (Ind.)	3 seats 1948–1961	
17th	1961	Constituency abolished. See Cork South-West				
