= John Pryor (soldier) =

American Continental officer

Major John Pryor of Richmond, Virginia served in the Continental Army under the overall command of Gen. George Washington in the American Revolutionary War. He served as an artillery officer from February 1777 to June 1779. From June 1779 to January 1783, he was aide-de-camp to Gen. William Alexander, Lord Stirling.

He is noted as the first husband of Anne Beverly Whiting, who after leaving Pryor became the mother of explorer John C. Frémont. Pryor remarried in 1815 to Elizabeth Quarles Graves. He had no surviving children from either marriage.

Major Pryor was a member of the Society of the Cincinnati. Pryor is buried at Shockoe Hill Cemetery, where on 4 June 2017 he was honored by the Sons of the American Revolution with a grave marker.
