= James Burke (Cork politician) =

Irish politician (1873–1936)

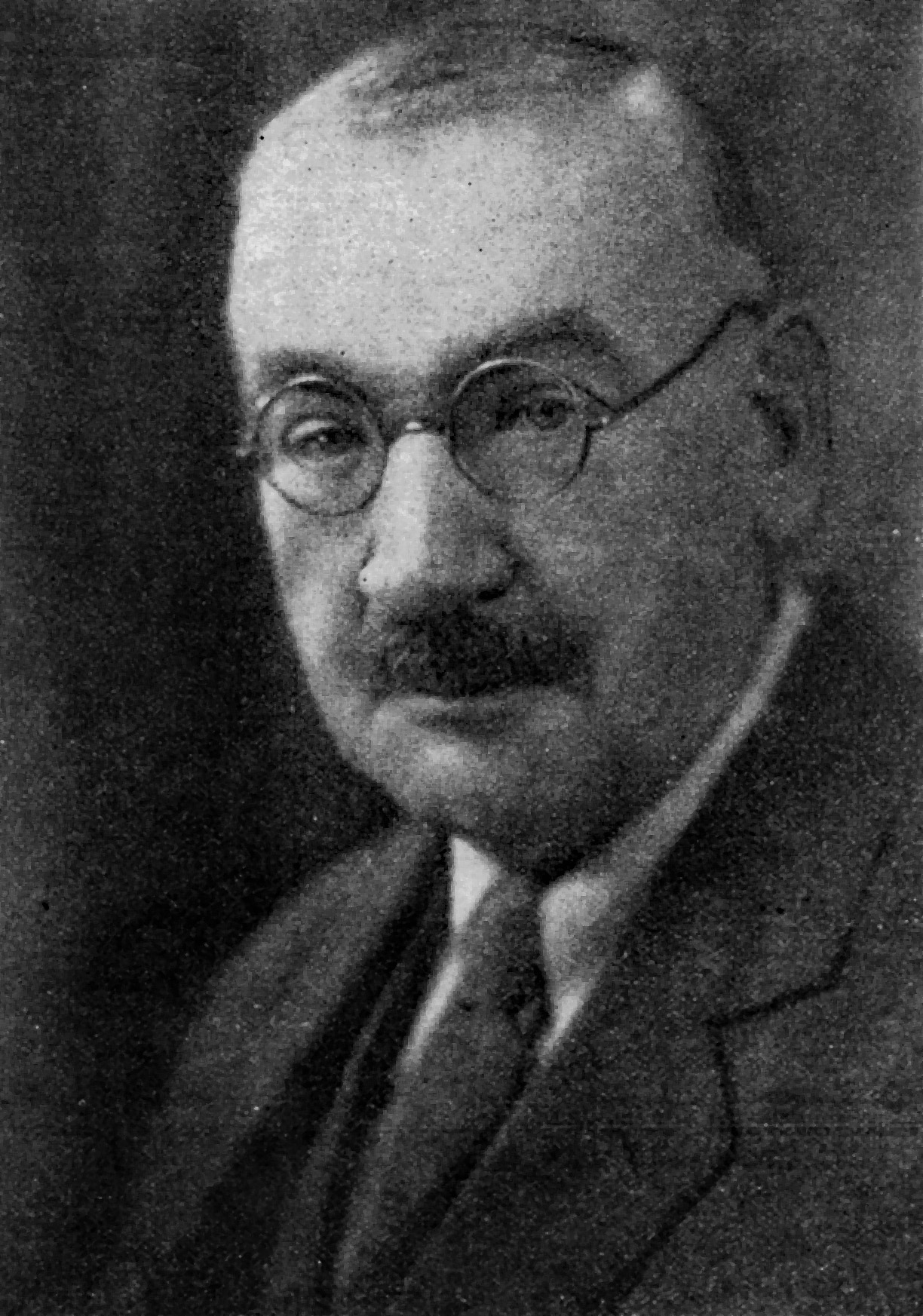

Teachta Dála
- In office January 1933 – 10 September 1936
- Constituency: Cork West

Personal details
- Born: 1873 Skibbereen, County Cork, Ireland
- Died: 10 September 1936 (aged 62–63) County Cork, Ireland
- Party: Fine Gael; Cumann na nGaedheal

James Michael Burke (1873 – 10 September 1936) was an Irish Cumann na nGaedheal politician, newspaper editor and barrister. He was born and lived in Skibbereen, County Cork. He was first appointed editor of the Southern Star newspaper in 1915 and held that post from 1921 to 1933.

As a public representative he served on the Skibbereen Urban Council, Cork County Council and he was elected to Dáil Éireann as a Cumann na nGaedhael Teachta Dála (TD) for the Cork West constituency at the 1933 general election. He died in office in 1936, but no by-election was held for his seat.

Burke was also a noted historian, writing numerous historical articles in the Southern Star newspaper and for journals such as the Journal of the Cork Historical and Archaeological Society.

Dáil	Election	Deputy (Party)	Deputy (Party)	Deputy (Party)	Deputy (Party)	Deputy (Party)
4th	1923	Timothy J. Murphy (Lab)	Seán Buckley (Rep)	Cornelius Connolly (CnaG)	John Prior (CnaG)	Timothy O'Donovan (FP)
5th	1927 (Jun)	Timothy J. Murphy (Lab)	Thomas Mullins (FF)	Timothy Sheehy (CnaG)	Jasper Wolfe (Ind.)	Timothy O'Donovan (FP)
6th	1927 (Sep)	Timothy J. Murphy (Lab)	Thomas Mullins (FF)	Timothy Sheehy (CnaG)	Jasper Wolfe (Ind.)	Timothy O'Donovan (FP)
7th	1932	Timothy J. Murphy (Lab)	Raphael Keyes (FF)	Eamonn O'Neill (CnaG)	Jasper Wolfe (Ind.)	Timothy O'Donovan (FP)
8th	1933	Timothy J. Murphy (Lab)	Tom Hales (FF)	Eamonn O'Neill (CnaG)	James Burke (CnaG)	Timothy O'Donovan (NCP)
9th	1937	Timothy J. Murphy (Lab)	Timothy O'Sullivan (FF)	Daniel O'Leary (FG)	Eamonn O'Neill (FG)	Timothy O'Donovan (FG)
10th	1938	Timothy J. Murphy (Lab)	Timothy O'Sullivan (FF)	Seán Buckley (FF)	Eamonn O'Neill (FG)	Timothy O'Donovan (FG)
11th	1943	Timothy J. Murphy (Lab)	Timothy O'Sullivan (FF)	Seán Buckley (FF)	Patrick O'Driscoll (Ind.)	Timothy O'Donovan (FG)
12th	1944	Timothy J. Murphy (Lab)	Timothy O'Sullivan (FF)	Seán Buckley (FF)	Patrick O'Driscoll (Ind.)	Eamonn O'Neill (FG)
13th	1948	Timothy J. Murphy (Lab)	Timothy O'Sullivan (FF)	Seán Collins (FG)	3 seats 1948–1961	
13th	1949 by-election	William J. Murphy (Lab)	Timothy O'Sullivan (FF)	Seán Collins (FG)	3 seats 1948–1961	
14th	1951	Michael Pat Murphy (Lab)	Timothy O'Sullivan (FF)	Seán Collins (FG)	3 seats 1948–1961	
15th	1954	Michael Pat Murphy (Lab)	Edward Cotter (FF)	Seán Collins (FG)	3 seats 1948–1961	
16th	1957	Michael Pat Murphy (Lab)	Edward Cotter (FF)	Florence Wycherley (Ind.)	3 seats 1948–1961	
17th	1961	Constituency abolished. See Cork South-West				
