= John Prior (cricketer) =

Irish cricketer

Personal information
- Full name: John Andrew Prior
- Born: 14 June 1960 (age 66); Dublin, Leinster, Ireland
- Batting: Right-handed
- Bowling: Right-arm medium

Domestic team information
- Years: Team
- 1981–1986: Ireland

Career statistics
Competition	First-class	List A
Matches	6	3
Runs scored	232	53
Batting average	25.77	17.66
100s/50s	0/2	0/1
Top score	87	50
Balls bowled	311	102
Wickets	3	0
Bowling average	39.66	–
5 wickets in innings	0	0
10 wickets in match	0	n/a
Best bowling	2/7	–
Catches/stumpings	3/–	1/–
- Source: Cricinfo, 24 October 2018

John Andrew Prior (born 14 June 1960) is a former Irish first-class cricketer.

Prior was born at Dublin in June 1960, where he was educated at Belvedere College. After completing his secondary education, he studied at the National Institute for Higher Education. After finishing his studies, Prior worked as an accountant. Playing his club cricket for Old Belvedere, Prior made his debut in first-class cricket for Ireland against Scotland at Dublin in 1981. He made his debut in List A cricket against Sussex in the 1983 NatWest Trophy. He played first-class and List A cricket for Ireland until 1986, making six appearances in first-class cricket and three in List A cricket. In first-class cricket, he scored 232 runs at a batting average of 25.77, with a high score of 87. This score, one of two half centuries he made, came against Scotland in 1984. With his medium pace bowling, Prior took 3 wickets with best figures of 2/7. In List A cricket, he scored 53 runs with a high score of 50, which came against Surrey at The Oval in the 1984 NatWest Trophy. His playing career for Ireland came to an end in 1986, and in 1988 he emigrated to Sydney to take up a position with IBM. While in Australia, he played second grade club cricket in Sydney.
