= June 1927 Irish general election =

Election to the 5th Dáil

- 9 June 1927

153 seats in Dáil Éireann (Note: Including Michael Hayes, returned automatically for the National University of Ireland as outgoing Ceann Comhairle, under Art. 21 of the Constitution, as amended by the Constitution (Amendment No. 2) Act 1927, and s. 2 of the Electoral (Amendment) Act 1927.) 77 (Note: The 5 Sinn Féin TDs did not take their seats, so the effective number of seats in the Dáil was 148, making a majority 75 seats.) seats needed for a majority
- Turnout: 68.1% ▲6.8 pp
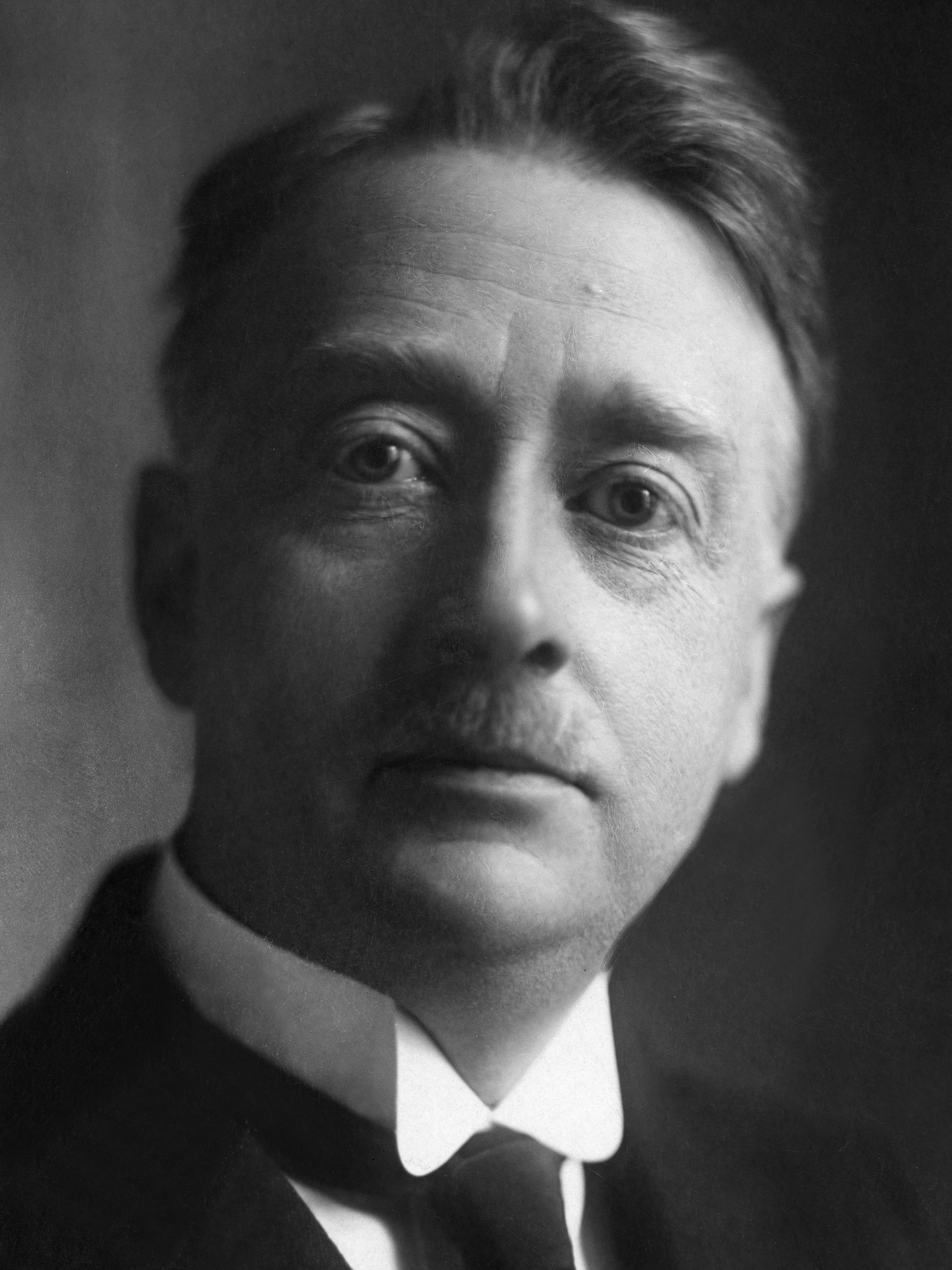

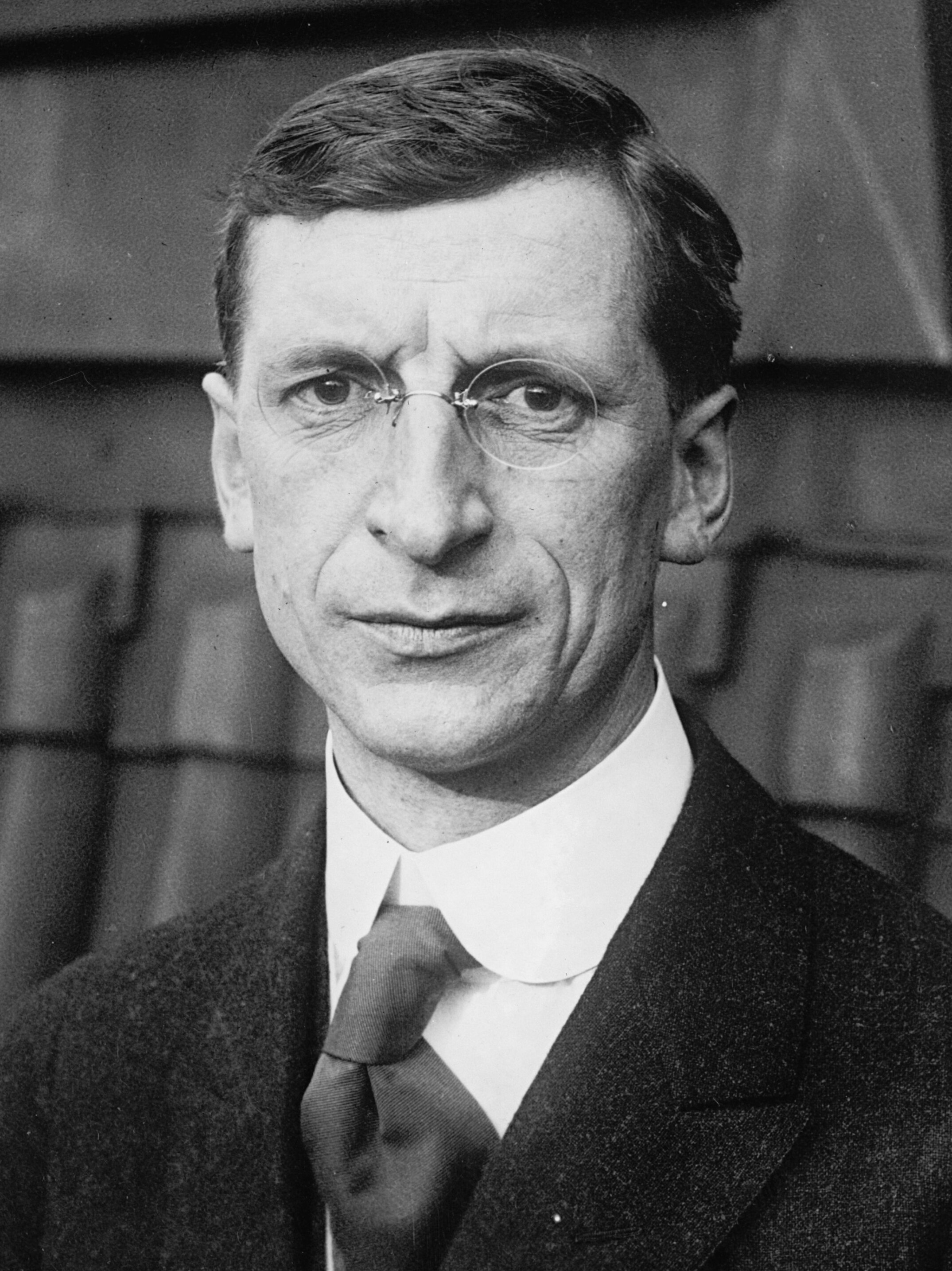

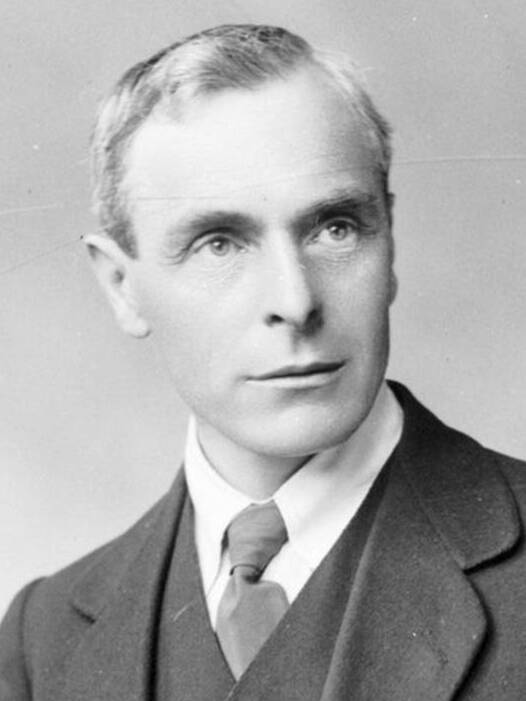

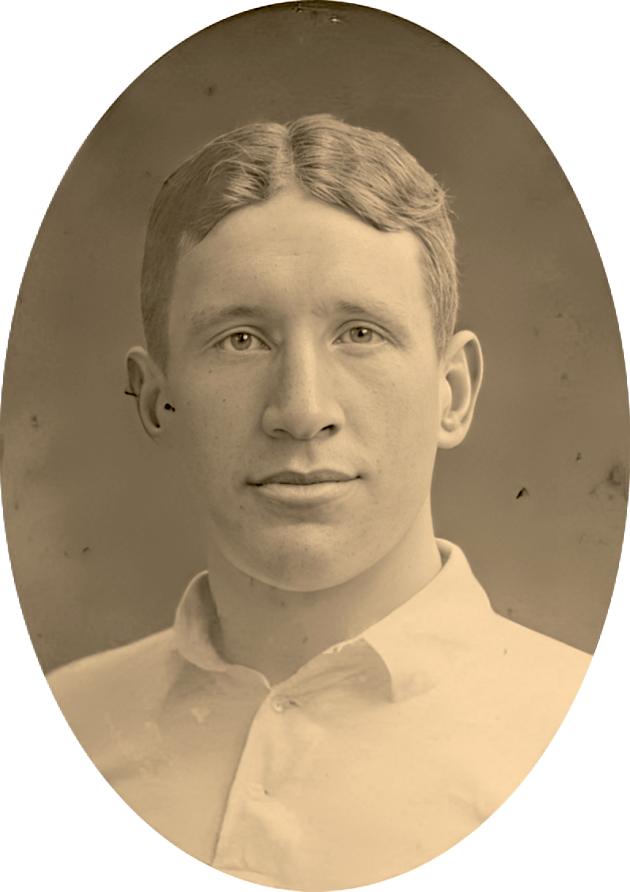

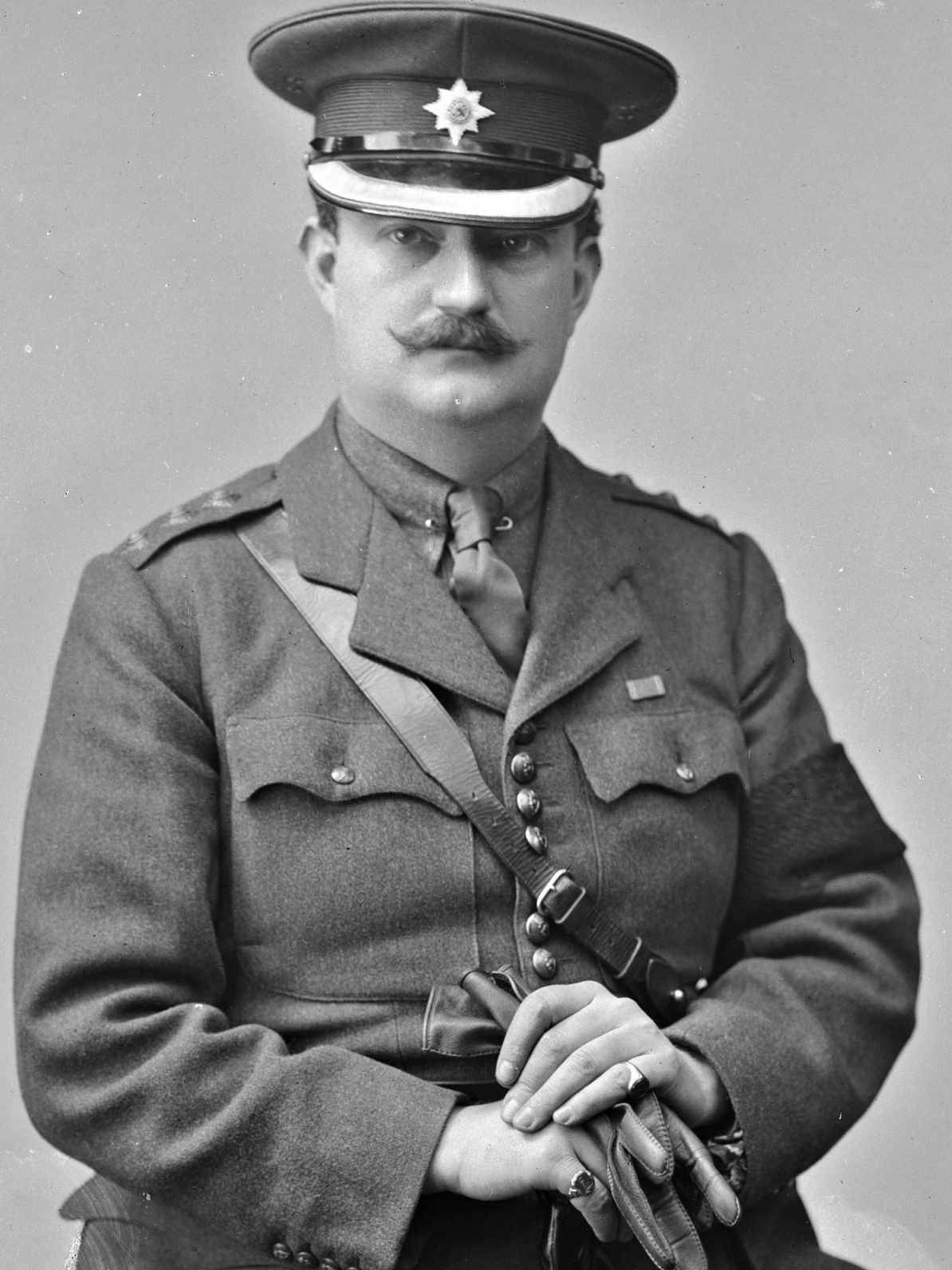

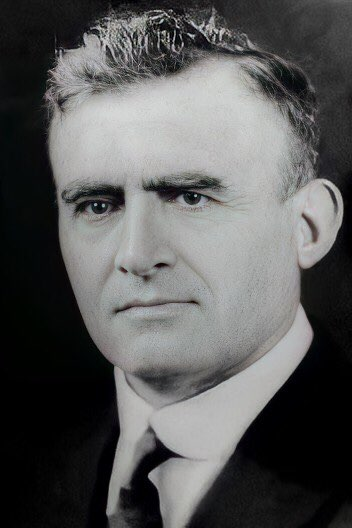
	First party	Second party	Third party
Leader	W. T. Cosgrave	Éamon de Valera	Thomas Johnson
Party	Cumann na nGaedheal	Fianna Fáil	Labour
Leader since	April 1923	26 March 1926	1914
Leader's seat	Carlow–Kilkenny	Clare	Dublin County
Last election	63 seats, 39.0%	N/A	14 seats, 10.6%
Seats won	47	44	22
Seat change	▼16	▲44	▲8
Popular vote	314,703	299,486	143,849
Percentage	27.4%	26.2%	12.6%
Swing	▼11.6 pp	New party	▲2.0 pp
	Fourth party	Fifth party	Sixth party
Leader	Michael Heffernan	William Redmond	John J. O'Kelly
Party	Farmers' Party	National League	Sinn Féin
Leader since	1927	1926	1926
Leader's seat	Tipperary	Waterford	N/A
Last election	15 seats, 12.1%	N/A	44 seats, 27.4%
Seats won	11	8	5
Seat change	▼4	▲8	▼39
Popular vote	101,955	83,598	41,401
Percentage	8.9%	7.3%	3.6%
Swing	▼3.2 pp	New party	▼23.8 pp
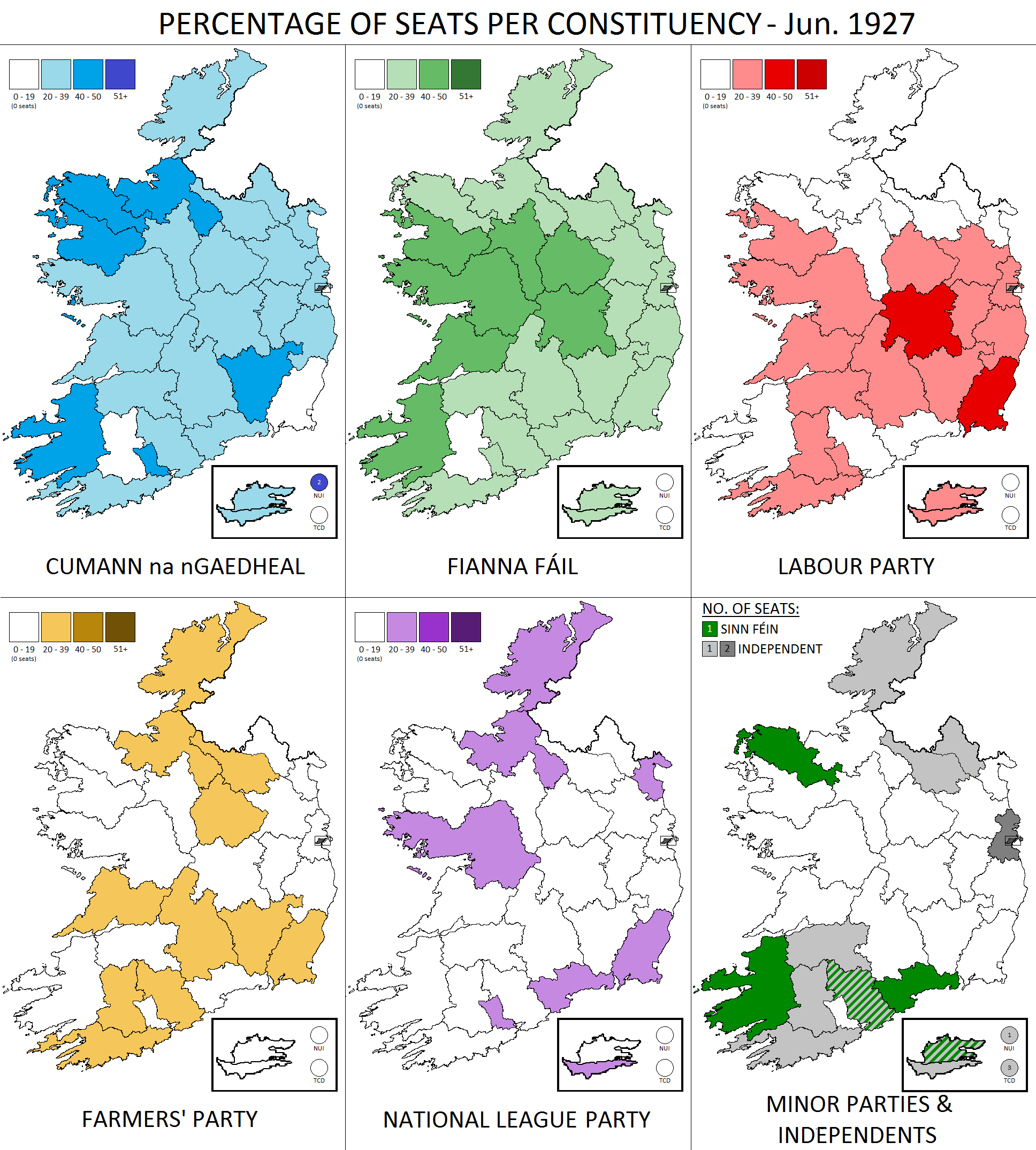
President of the Executive Council before election
W. T. Cosgrave
Cumann na nGaedheal
President of the Executive Council after election
W. T. Cosgrave
Cumann na nGaedheal

The June 1927 Irish general election was to elect the 5th Dáil held on Thursday, 9 June following the dissolution of the 4th Dáil on 23 May 1927. It was the first election contested by Fianna Fáil, which had been formed a year earlier by Éamon de Valera, former leader of the abstentionist Anti-Treaty Sinn Féin. De Valera resigned from Sinn Féin after he failed to convince the party to take their seats if and when the Oath of Allegiance were abolished. Most of Sinn Féin's TDs, as well as the bulk of its support, followed De Valera to Fianna Fáil. The impact of this shift saw Sinn Féin all but decimated; it was reduced to five seats.

This election is considered a classic realigning election. It all but ended Sinn Féin as a major force in the southern part of the island in its original form; it would not win more than 10 seats at an election until 2011, by which time it had undergone fundamental transformation. It also cemented Fianna Fáil as a major party in one stroke. Either Fianna Fáil or Cumann na nGaedheal/Fine Gael have led every government since, and they would remain the two largest parties in Ireland until 2020 when Sinn Féin came first in first preference votes (tied with Fianna Fáil in seats).

The 5th Dáil assembled at Leinster House on 23 June to nominate the President of the Executive Council and Executive Council of the Irish Free State for appointment by the Governor-General. W. T. Cosgrave was re-appointed leading a government of Cumann na nGaedheal.

Fianna Fáil took the oath of allegiance and its seats in the Dáil on 12 August 1927. Fianna Fáil's decision to take up its seats ended Cumann na nGaedheal's working majority, forcing Cosgrave into a minority government which proved unstable. After government victories in two by-elections, Cosgrave sought a dissolution on 25 August and a second election of that year was held in September 1927.

== Result ==
Election to the 5th Dáil – 9 June 1927
Party	Leader	Seats	±	% of seats	First pref. votes	% FPv	±%
Cumann na nGaedheal	W. T. Cosgrave	47	–16	30.7	314,703	27.4	–11.6
Fianna Fáil	Éamon de Valera	44	New	28.7	299,486	26.2	New
Labour	Thomas Johnson	22	+8	14.4	143,849	12.6	+2.0
Farmers' Party	Michael Heffernan	11	–4	7.2	101,955	8.9	–3.2
National League	William Redmond	8	New	5.2	83,598	7.3	New
Sinn Féin	John J. O'Kelly	5 (Note: Results given for Sinn Féin here are compared to those won by Republicans in the previous election.)	–39	3.3	41,401	3.6	–23.8
Clann Éireann	William Magennis	0	New	0	5,527	0.5	New
Blind Men's Party		0	New	0	1,559	0.1	New
Town Tenants' Association		0	0	0	1,012	0.1	–0.1
Independent	N/A	16	+3	10.4	153,370	13.4	+5.3
Spoilt votes					31,337	—N/a	—N/a
Total		153	0	100	1,177,797	100	—N/a
Electorate/Turnout					1,730,177	68.1	—N/a

=== Voting summary ===
First preference vote
Cumann na nGaedheal	27.44%
Fianna Fáil	26.12%
Labour	12.55%
Farmers'	8.89%
National League Party	7.29%
Sinn Féin	3.61%
Others	0.71%
Independent	13.37%

=== Seats summary ===
Dáil seats
Cumann na nGaedheal	30.72%
Fianna Fáil	28.76%
Labour	14.38%
Farmers'	7.19%
National League Party	5.23%
Sinn Féin	3.27%
Independent	10.46%

== Government formation ==
When the 5th Dáil first met on 23 June 1927, there were 50 TDs still abstaining. Cumann na nGaedheal formed the 3rd Executive Council of the Irish Free State with the support of the Farmers' Party and 13 Independents. This government proved unstable once Fianna Fáil took their seats.

== Changes in membership ==
=== First time TDs ===
- Tadhg Crowley
- Patrick Boland
- Andrew Fogarty
- John Jinks
- Michael Keyes
- Michael Óg McFadden
- Thomas Mullins
- Patrick O'Dowd
- Matthew O'Reilly
- Timothy Quill
- Jasper Wolfe

=== Outgoing TDs ===
- Cornelius Connolly (Retired)
- Patrick McFadden (Lost seat)
