= 1923 Irish general election =

Election to the 4th Dáil

- 27 August 1923

All 153 seats in Dáil Éireann 77 (Note: The 44 Republican TDs did not take their seats, so the effective number of seats in the Dáil was 109, making a majority 55 seats.) seats needed for a majority
- Turnout: 61.3% ▼1.2 pp
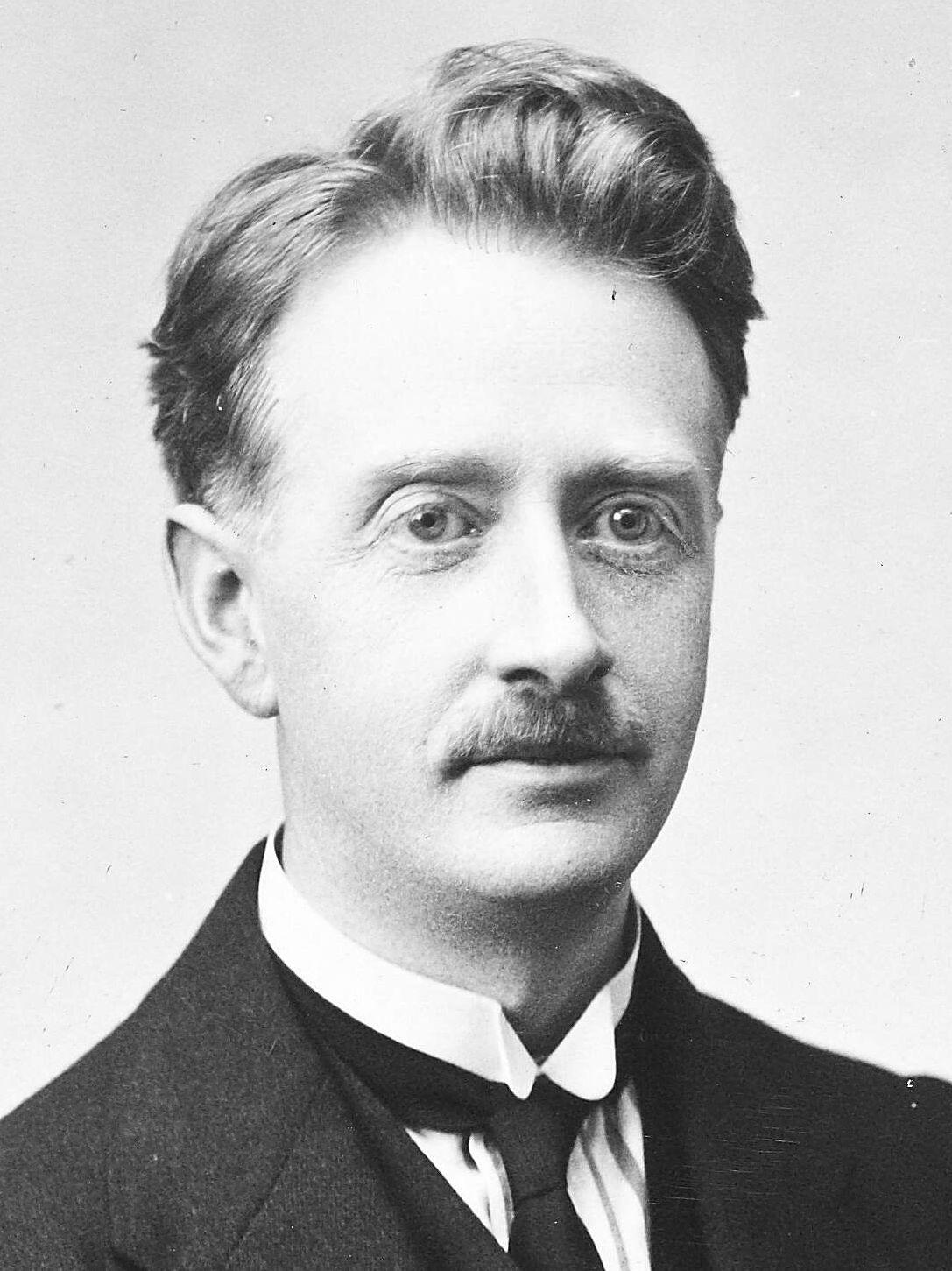

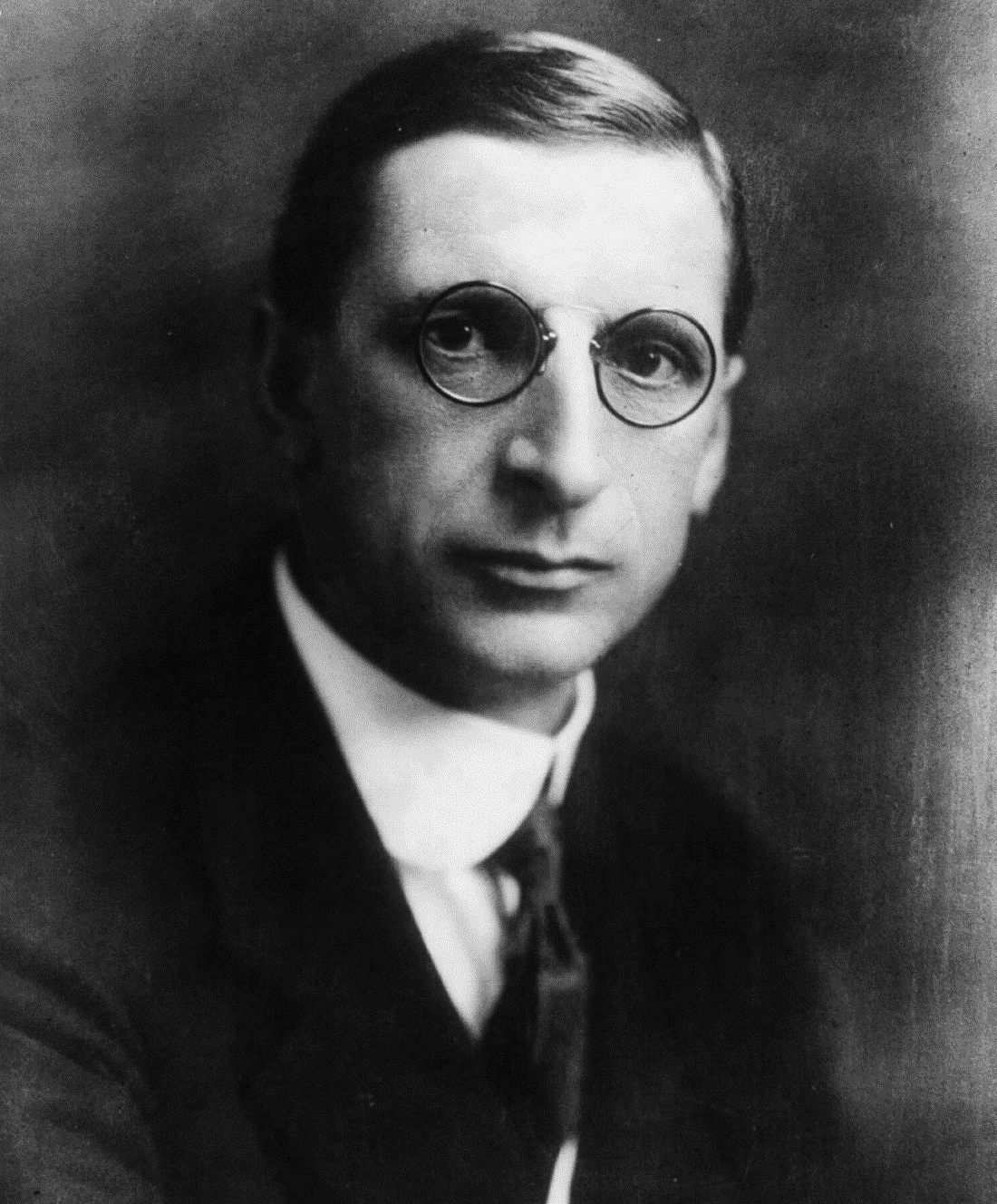

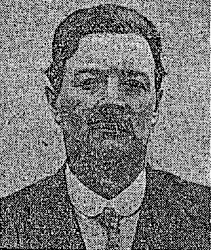

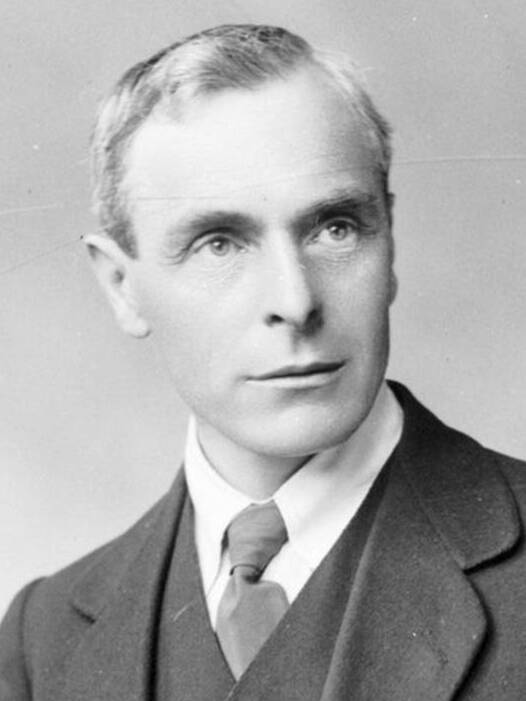
| | First party | Second party |
|---|---|---|
| Leader | W. T. Cosgrave | Éamon de Valera |
| Party | Cumann na nGaedheal | Republican |
| Leader since | April 1923 | 1917 |
| Leader's seat | Carlow–Kilkenny | Clare |
| Last election | 58 seats, 38.5% | 36 seats, 21.8% |
| Seats won | 63 | 44 |
| Seat change | ▲5 (Note: Cumann na nGaedheal's results are compared with those of the Pro-Treaty faction of Sinn Féin in the previous general election.) | ▲8 (Note: Results given for Republicans here are compared to those won by the Anti-Treaty faction of Sinn Féin in the previous election.) |
| Popular vote | 410,695 | 288,794 |
| Percentage | 39.0% | 27.4% |
| Swing | ▲0.5 pp | ▲5.6 pp |
| | Third party | Fourth party |
| Leader | Denis Gorey | Thomas Johnson |
| Party | Farmers' Party | Labour |
| Leader since | 1922 | 1914 |
| Leader's seat | Carlow–Kilkenny | Dublin County |
| Last election | 7 seats, 7.8% | 16 seats, 21.3% |
| Seats won | 15 | 14 |
| Seat change | ▲8 | ▼3 |
| Popular vote | 127,184 | 111,939 |
| Percentage | 12.1% | 10.6% |
| Swing | ▲4.3 pp | ▼10.7 pp |
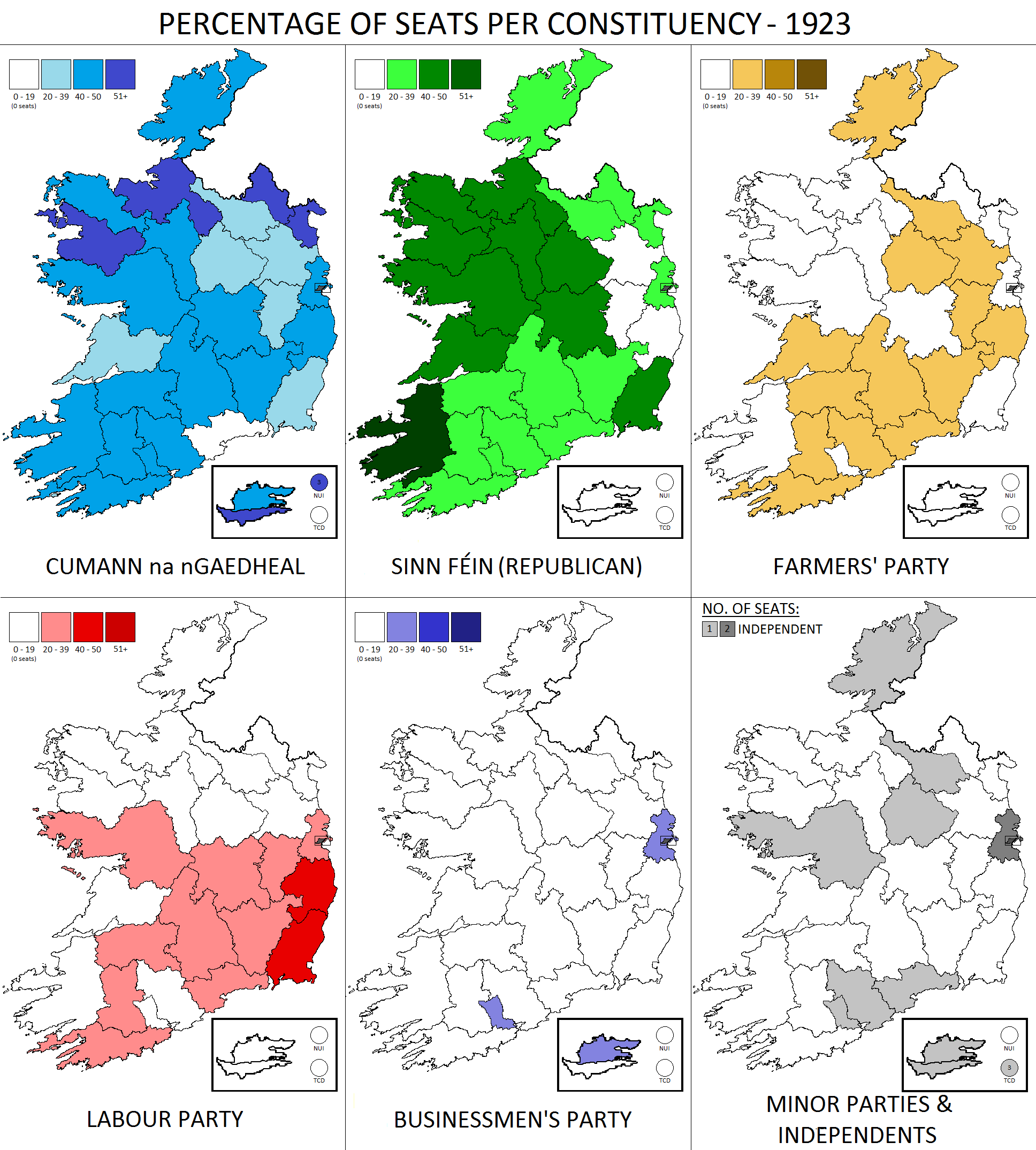
President of the Executive Council before election
W. T. Cosgrave
Cumann na nGaedheal
President of the Executive Council after election
W. T. Cosgrave
Cumann na nGaedheal

The 1923 Irish general election to elect the 4th Dáil was held on Monday, 27 August, following the dissolution of the 3rd Dáil on 9 August 1923. It was the first general election held since the establishment of the Irish Free State on 6 December 1922. The election was held shortly after the end of the Irish Civil War in May 1923. Many of the Republican TDs, who represented the losing anti-Treaty side, were still imprisoned during and after the election and had committed to not participating in the Dáil if elected.

The 4th Dáil assembled at Leinster House on 19 September to nominate the President of the Executive Council and Executive Council of the Irish Free State for appointment by the Governor-General. Cumann na nGaedheal, the successor to the Pro-Treaty wing of Sinn Féin, won the election and formed the government. Despite falling 14 seats of an outright majority, the opposition Republican TDs refused to take their seats, giving CnG effective control of the chamber and allowing it to form what amounted to a majority government.

== Legal background ==
It was the first general election fought since the establishment of the Irish Free State and the adoption of the Constitution of the Irish Free State on 6 December 1922. It was contested under the Electoral Act 1923, which increased the seats in the Dáil from 128 to 153, and introduced a franchise of all citizens over the age of 21, without distinction of sex. Lax electoral practices were tightened up by The Prevention of Electoral Abuses Act 1923.

== Result ==
Election to the 4th Dáil – 27 August 1923
| Party | Leader | Seats | ± | % of seats | First pref. votes | % FPv | ±% |
|---|---|---|---|---|---|---|---|
| Cumann na nGaedheal | W. T. Cosgrave | 63 | +5 | 41.2 | 410,695 | 39.0 | +0.5 |
| Republican | Éamon de Valera | 44 | +8 | 28.7 | 288,794 | 27.4 | +5.6 |
| Farmers' Party | Denis Gorey | 15 | +8 | 9.8 | 127,184 | 12.1 | +4.3 |
| Labour | Thomas Johnson | 14 | −3 | 9.2 | 111,939 | 10.6 | −10.7 |
| Businessmen's Party | N/A | 2 | +2 | 1.3 | 9,648 | 0.9 | −1.4 |
| Cork Progressive Association | N/A | 2 (Note: Andrew O'Shaughnessy and Richard Beamish were elected under the label of Cork Progressive Association, a group associated with the Businessmen's Party.) | New | 1.3 | 6,588 | 0.6 | New |
| National Democratic | N/A | 0 | New | 0 | 4,968 | 0.5 | New |
| Dublin Trades Council | P. T. Daly | 0 | New | 0 | 3,847 | 0.4 | New |
| Ratepayers' Association | N/A | 0 | ±0 | 0 | 2,620 | 0.2 | −0.2 |
| Town Tenants' Association | N/A | 0 | New | 0 | 1,803 | 0.2 | New |
| Independent | N/A | 13 | +4 | 8.5 | 85,869 | 8.1 | +0.3 |
| Spoilt votes | | | | | 40,047 | —N/a | —N/a |
| Total | | 153 | +25 | 100 | 1,094,002 | 100 | —N/a |
| Electorate/Turnout | | | | | 1,786,318 | 61.3 | —N/a |

Most parties made gains, in part because the total number of seats in the Dáil was increased by 25 from 128 to 153.

=== Voting summary ===
First preference vote
| Cumann na nGaedheal | 38.97% |
| Republican | 27.40% |
| Farmers' | 12.07% |
| Labour | 10.62% |
| Businessman's | 0.92% |
| Cork Progressive Association | 0.63% |
| Others | 1.26% |
| Independent | 8.15% |

=== Seats summary ===
Dáil seats
| Cumann na nGaedheal | 41.18% |
| Republican | 28.76% |
| Farmers' | 9.80% |
| Labour | 9.15% |
| Businessman's | 1.31% |
| Cork Progressive Association | 1.31% |
| Independent | 8.50% |

== Government formation ==
The Republican TDs continued to abstain from the Dáil. Therefore, Cumann na nGaedheal had a majority of seats which were taken in the Dáil and formed the 2nd Executive Council of the Irish Free State on 19 September 1923.

== Changes in membership ==
=== First time TDs ===
- Frank Aiken
- Patrick Baxter
- Dan Breen
- Frank Cahill
- John James Cole
- Margaret Collins-O'Driscoll
- Cornelius Connolly
- Edward Doyle
- Peadar Doyle
- Seán Gibbons
- Kathleen Lynn
- Patrick McFadden
- James Myles
- Michael Shelly
- Paddy Smith

=== Retiring TDs ===
- Gerald Fitzgibbon
- Joseph Whelehan

=== Defeated TDs ===
- Walter L. Cole
- Robert Day
- Patrick Gaffney
