= 7th Dáil =

TDs from 1932 to 1933

←	6th Dáil	8th Dáil	→

Overview
- Legislative body: Dáil Éireann
- Jurisdiction: Irish Free State
- Meeting place: Leinster House
- Term: 9 March 1932 – 2 January 1933
- Election: 1932 general election
- Government: 6th executive council
- Members: 153
- Ceann Comhairle: Frank Fahy
- President of the Executive Council: Éamon de Valera
- Vice-President of the Executive Council: Seán T. O'Kelly
- Chief Whip: Gerald Boland
- Leader of the Opposition: W. T. Cosgrave

Sessions
- 1st: 9 March 1932 – 5 August 1932
- 2nd: 19 October 1932 – 22 December 1932

The 7th Dáil was elected at the 1932 general election on 16 February 1932 and met on 9 March 1932. The members of Dáil Éireann, the Chamber of Deputies of the Oireachtas (legislature) of the Irish Free State, are known as TDs. It was one of two houses of the Oireachtas, sitting with the First Seanad constituted as the 1931 Seanad. The 7th Dáil was dissolved by Governor-General Domhnall Ua Buachalla, at the request of the President of the Executive Council Éamon de Valera on 2 January 1933. The 7th Dáil lasted 299 days. There were no by-elections during the 7th Dáil.

== Composition of the 7th Dáil ==
- 6th Executive Council
- Providing confidence and supply

Party	Feb. 1932	Jan. 1933	Change
Fianna Fáil	72	70	▼2
Cumann na nGaedheal	57	54	▼3
Labour	8	8	Steady
Farmers' Party	3	3	Steady
Independent	14	14	Steady
Ceann Comhairle	—N/a	1	▲1
Vacant	—N/a	4	▲4
Total	153		

Fianna Fáil formed the 6th executive council of the Irish Free State, a minority government dependent on the support of the Labour Party.

=== Graphical representation ===
This is a graphical comparison of party strengths in the 7th Dáil from March 1932. This was not the official seating plan.

== Ceann Comhairle ==
On 9 March 1932, Frank Fahy (FF) was proposed by Gerald Boland and seconded by Denis Allen for the position of Ceann Comhairle. Michael Hayes (CnaG), who had been Ceann Comhairle since 1922, was proposed by W. T. Cosgrave and seconded by Ernest Blythe for the position. Fahy was elected by a vote of 78 to 71.

== TDs by constituency ==
The 153 TDs elected at the 1932 general election are listed by Dáil constituency.

Members of the 7th Dáil
Constituency	Name	Party
Carlow–Kilkenny	Desmond FitzGerald	Cumann na nGaedheal
Carlow–Kilkenny	Seán Gibbons	Fianna Fáil
Carlow–Kilkenny	Denis Gorey	Cumann na nGaedheal
Carlow–Kilkenny	Francis Humphreys	Fianna Fáil
Carlow–Kilkenny	Thomas Derrig	Fianna Fáil
Cavan	John O'Hanlon	Independent
Cavan	John Joe O'Reilly	Cumann na nGaedheal
Cavan	Michael Sheridan	Fianna Fáil
Cavan	Paddy Smith	Fianna Fáil
Clare	Patrick Burke	Cumann na nGaedheal
Clare	Éamon de Valera	Fianna Fáil
Clare	Patrick Hogan	Labour
Clare	Seán O'Grady	Fianna Fáil
Clare	Martin Sexton	Fianna Fáil
Cork Borough	Richard Anthony	Independent
Cork Borough	W. T. Cosgrave	Cumann na nGaedheal
Cork Borough	William Desmond	Cumann na nGaedheal
Cork Borough	Thomas Dowdall	Fianna Fáil
Cork Borough	Hugo Flinn	Fianna Fáil
Cork East	Brook Brasier	Independent
Cork East	William Broderick	Cumann na nGaedheal
Cork East	Martin Corry	Fianna Fáil
Cork East	John Daly	Cumann na nGaedheal
Cork East	Patrick Murphy	Fianna Fáil
Cork North	Seán Moylan	Fianna Fáil
Cork North	Daniel O'Leary	Cumann na nGaedheal
Cork North	Daniel Vaughan	Farmers' Party
Cork West	Raphael Keyes	Fianna Fáil
Cork West	Timothy J. Murphy	Labour
Cork West	Timothy O'Donovan	Farmers' Party
Cork West	Eamonn O'Neill	Cumann na nGaedheal
Cork West	Jasper Wolfe	Independent
Donegal	Neal Blaney	Fianna Fáil
Donegal	Brian Brady	Fianna Fáil
Donegal	Frank Carney	Fianna Fáil
Donegal	James Dillon	Independent
Donegal	Eugene Doherty	Cumann na nGaedheal
Donegal	Daniel McMenamin	Cumann na nGaedheal
Donegal	James Myles	Independent
Donegal	John White	Cumann na nGaedheal
Dublin North	Cormac Breathnach	Fianna Fáil
Dublin North	Alfie Byrne	Independent
Dublin North	John Byrne	Cumann na nGaedheal
Dublin North	Eamonn Cooney	Fianna Fáil
Dublin North	Margaret Collins-O'Driscoll	Cumann na nGaedheal
Dublin North	Richard Mulcahy	Cumann na nGaedheal
Dublin North	Seán T. O'Kelly	Fianna Fáil
Dublin North	Oscar Traynor	Fianna Fáil
Dublin South	James Beckett	Cumann na nGaedheal
Dublin South	Robert Briscoe	Fianna Fáil
Dublin South	Peadar Doyle	Cumann na nGaedheal
Dublin South	Thomas Hennessy	Cumann na nGaedheal
Dublin South	Myles Keogh	Cumann na nGaedheal
Dublin South	Seán Lemass	Fianna Fáil
Dublin South	James Lynch	Fianna Fáil
Dublin County	Seán Brady	Fianna Fáil
Dublin County	Patrick Curran	Labour
Dublin County	Henry Dockrell	Cumann na nGaedheal
Dublin County	Thomas Finlay	Cumann na nGaedheal
Dublin County	John Good	Independent
Dublin County	Seán MacEntee	Fianna Fáil
Dublin County	Batt O'Connor	Cumann na nGaedheal
Dublin County	Gearóid O'Sullivan	Cumann na nGaedheal
Dublin University	Ernest Alton	Independent
Dublin University	James Craig	Independent
Dublin University	William Thrift	Independent
Galway	Gerald Bartley	Fianna Fáil
Galway	Patrick Beegan	Fianna Fáil
Galway	Seán Broderick	Cumann na nGaedheal
Galway	Frank Fahy	Fianna Fáil
Galway	Patrick Hogan	Cumann na nGaedheal
Galway	Stephen Jordan	Fianna Fáil
Galway	Fred McDonogh	Cumann na nGaedheal
Galway	Joseph Mongan	Cumann na nGaedheal
Galway	Thomas Powell	Fianna Fáil
Kerry	Frederick Crowley	Fianna Fáil
Kerry	John Flynn	Fianna Fáil
Kerry	Eamon Kissane	Fianna Fáil
Kerry	Fionán Lynch	Cumann na nGaedheal
Kerry	Tom McEllistrim	Fianna Fáil
Kerry	Thomas O'Reilly	Fianna Fáil
Kerry	John O'Sullivan	Cumann na nGaedheal
Kildare	Thomas Harris	Fianna Fáil
Kildare	Sydney Minch	Cumann na nGaedheal
Kildare	William Norton	Labour
Leitrim–Sligo	William Browne	Fianna Fáil
Leitrim–Sligo	Frank Carty	Fianna Fáil
Leitrim–Sligo	Stephen Flynn	Fianna Fáil
Leitrim–Sligo	John Hennigan	Cumann na nGaedheal
Leitrim–Sligo	Bernard Maguire	Fianna Fáil
Leitrim–Sligo	Martin Roddy	Cumann na nGaedheal
Leitrim–Sligo	Mary Reynolds	Cumann na nGaedheal
Leix–Offaly	Patrick Boland	Fianna Fáil
Leix–Offaly	William Davin	Labour
Leix–Offaly	Patrick Gorry	Fianna Fáil
Leix–Offaly	Eugene O'Brien	Cumann na nGaedheal
Leix–Offaly	Thomas F. O'Higgins	Cumann na nGaedheal
Limerick	George C. Bennett	Cumann na nGaedheal
Limerick	Daniel Bourke	Fianna Fáil
Limerick	James Colbert	Fianna Fáil
Limerick	Tadhg Crowley	Fianna Fáil
Limerick	John O'Shaughnessy	Farmers' Party
Limerick	James Reidy	Cumann na nGaedheal
Limerick	Robert Ryan	Fianna Fáil
Longford–Westmeath	James Geoghegan	Fianna Fáil
Longford–Westmeath	Francis Gormley	Fianna Fáil
Longford–Westmeath	Michael Kennedy	Fianna Fáil
Longford–Westmeath	Seán Mac Eoin	Cumann na nGaedheal
Longford–Westmeath	Patrick Shaw	Cumann na nGaedheal
Louth	Frank Aiken	Fianna Fáil
Louth	James Coburn	Independent
Louth	James Murphy	Cumann na nGaedheal
Mayo North	Micheál Clery	Fianna Fáil
Mayo North	Michael Davis	Cumann na nGaedheal
Mayo North	Patrick O'Hara	Cumann na nGaedheal
Mayo North	P. J. Ruttledge	Fianna Fáil
Mayo South	James FitzGerald-Kenney	Cumann na nGaedheal
Mayo South	Michael Kilroy	Fianna Fáil
Mayo South	Edward Moane	Fianna Fáil
Mayo South	Martin Nally	Cumann na nGaedheal
Mayo South	Richard Walsh	Fianna Fáil
Meath	Eamonn Duggan	Cumann na nGaedheal
Meath	James Kelly	Fianna Fáil
Meath	Matthew O'Reilly	Fianna Fáil
Monaghan	Ernest Blythe	Cumann na nGaedheal
Monaghan	Eamon Rice	Fianna Fáil
Monaghan	Conn Ward	Fianna Fáil
National University	Michael Hayes	Cumann na nGaedheal
National University	Conor Maguire	Fianna Fáil
National University	Patrick McGilligan	Cumann na nGaedheal
Roscommon	Gerald Boland	Fianna Fáil
Roscommon	Martin Conlon	Cumann na nGaedheal
Roscommon	Frank MacDermot	Independent
Roscommon	Daniel O'Rourke	Fianna Fáil
Tipperary	Dan Breen	Fianna Fáil
Tipperary	Séamus Burke	Cumann na nGaedheal
Tipperary	Andrew Fogarty	Fianna Fáil
Tipperary	John Hassett	Cumann na nGaedheal
Tipperary	Seán Hayes	Fianna Fáil
Tipperary	Daniel Morrissey	Independent
Tipperary	Timothy Sheehy	Fianna Fáil
Waterford	Seán Goulding	Fianna Fáil
Waterford	John Kiersey	Cumann na nGaedheal
Waterford	Patrick Little	Fianna Fáil
Waterford	William Redmond	Cumann na nGaedheal
Wexford	Denis Allen	Fianna Fáil
Wexford	Richard Corish	Labour
Wexford	Osmond Esmonde	Cumann na nGaedheal
Wexford	John Keating	Cumann na nGaedheal
Wexford	James Ryan	Fianna Fáil
Wicklow	James Everett	Labour
Wicklow	Séamus Moore	Fianna Fáil
Wicklow	Dermot O'Mahony	Cumann na nGaedheal

== Changes ==
Date	Constituency	Loss	Gain	Note
27 February 1932	Cork East	Cumann na nGaedheal		Death of John Daly
9 March 1932	Galway	Fianna Fáil	Ceann Comhairle	Frank Fahy takes office as Ceann Comhairle
17 April 1932	Waterford	Cumann na nGaedheal		Death of William Redmond
19 October 1932	Donegal	Fianna Fáil		Death of Frank Carney
22 November 1932	Dublin County	Cumann na nGaedheal		Death of Thomas Finlay
