= Mark Killilea Snr =

Irish politician (1897–1970)

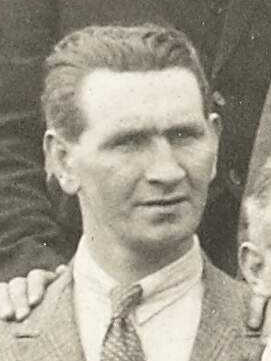
- Killilea in 1927

Senator
- In office 14 December 1961 – 5 November 1969
- Constituency: Labour Panel

Teachta Dála
- In office February 1948 – October 1961
- Constituency: Galway North
- In office July 1937 – February 1948
- Constituency: Galway East
- In office January 1933 – July 1937
- In office June 1927 – February 1932
- Constituency: Galway

Personal details
- Born: 15 January 1897 Cloonnabricka, County Galway, Ireland
- Died: 29 September 1970 (aged 73) County Galway, Ireland
- Party: Fianna Fáil
- Spouse: Mary Joan Turner (m. 1930)
- Children: Mark Killilea Jnr

Military service
- Allegiance: Irish Volunteers; Irish Republican Army; Anti-Treaty IRA
- Battles/wars: Irish War of Independence; Irish Civil War

Mark Killilea Snr (15 January 1897 – 29 September 1970) was an Irish Fianna Fáil politician. He was a Teachta Dála (TD) for constituencies in County Galway for over 30 years, and then a Senator for 8 years.

== Biography ==
Killilea was born in the townland of Cloonnabricka, Ballinamore Bridge, County Galway, to Pat Killilea, a labourer, and Anne Giblin.

Killilea claimed membership of the Irish Volunteers from 1917 and engaged in active service with the Irish Republican Army from April 1918 to September 1923, during the Irish War of Independence and Irish Civil War, in counties Wexford, Galway and Mayo. He was wounded in May 1921.

Killilea was a founder-member of Fianna Fáil and a farmer and shopkeeper before entering politics. He was elected to Dáil Éireann on his first attempt, at the June 1927 general election in the nine-seat Galway constituency. He took his seat in the 5th Dáil, along with the 44 other Fianna Fáil TDs who ended the Republican policy of abstentionism and took the disputed oath of allegiance, dismissing it as an "empty formula".

He was re-elected at the September 1927 general election. However, in the Fianna Fáil victory at the 1932 general election, it won no new seats in Galway. All five sitting Fianna Fáil TDs stood for re-election, but the party ran a total of seven candidates in the constituency and Killilea was one of the two sitting TDs to lose their seats to party colleagues. He was re-elected the following year, displacing Cumann na nGaedheal's Joseph Mongan.

Killilea was then re-elected at all the eight general elections in the next 28 years, switching to the new Galway East constituency when the county's parliamentary representation was split at the 1937 election, and choosing Galway North after a further constituency revision for the 1948 general election.

At the 1961 general election, he lost his seat again, this time in the restored Galway East constituency. The county's three 3-seat constituencies had been replaced by the 3-seat Galway West and the 5-seat Galway East, where Killilea was one of four sitting Fianna Fáil TDs who stood for re-election. Michael Kitt and Michael Carty had both been returned at the previous general election, and Anthony Millar had won a by-election in 1958. It would have been difficult for Fianna Fáil to win four out of five seats, and with 55% of the first-preference vote the party took three seats: Killilea was the loser.

He then stood for election to Seanad Éireann on the Labour Panel, and was returned to the 10th Seanad. He was re-elected at the 1965 Seanad election to the 11th Seanad, but stood down in 1969 in favour of his son Mark Killilea Jnr, who was elected to the 12th Seanad.

He married Mary Joan Turner in 1930.

=== Untold Secrets allegations ===
In 1958 Killilea and his wife fostered Anne Silke, a former resident of the Tuam Mother and Baby Home. Before she died Anne Silke gave evidence reported in the 2021 documentary Untold Secrets produced by Nova Productions and directed by Basque filmmaker Teresa Lavina that she was beaten and abused while in the family's care and used as little more than a slave. Silke alleged she was physically assaulted by the late Mark Killilea Jnr. She also alleged she was sexually assaulted by another son in the family.

== See also ==
- Families in the Oireachtas

Dáil	Election	Deputy (Party)	Deputy (Party)	Deputy (Party)	Deputy (Party)	Deputy (Party)	Deputy (Party)	Deputy (Party)	Deputy (Party)	Deputy (Party)
2nd	1921	Liam Mellows (SF)	Bryan Cusack (SF)	Frank Fahy (SF)	Joseph Whelehan (SF)	Pádraic Ó Máille (SF)	George Nicolls (SF)	Patrick Hogan (SF)	7 seats 1921–1923	
3rd	1922	Thomas O'Connell (Lab)	Bryan Cusack (AT-SF)	Frank Fahy (AT-SF)	Joseph Whelehan (PT-SF)	Pádraic Ó Máille (PT-SF)	George Nicolls (PT-SF)	Patrick Hogan (PT-SF)	7 seats 1921–1923	
4th	1923	Thomas O'Connell (Lab)	Barney Mellows (Rep)	Frank Fahy (Rep)	Louis O'Dea (Rep)	Pádraic Ó Máille (CnaG)	George Nicolls (CnaG)	Patrick Hogan (CnaG)	Seán Broderick (CnaG)	James Cosgrave (Ind.)
5th	1927 (Jun)	Gilbert Lynch (Lab)	Thomas Powell (FF)	Frank Fahy (Note: Frank Fahy served as Ceann Comhairle from 9 March 1932.) (FF)	Seán Tubridy (FF)	Mark Killilea Snr (FF)	Martin McDonogh (CnaG)	Patrick Hogan (CnaG)	Seán Broderick (CnaG)	William Duffy (NL)
6th	1927 (Sep)	Stephen Jordan (FF)	Thomas Powell (FF)	Frank Fahy (FF)	Seán Tubridy (FF)	Mark Killilea Snr (FF)	Martin McDonogh (CnaG)	Patrick Hogan (CnaG)	Seán Broderick (CnaG)	Joseph Mongan (CnaG)
7th	1932	Stephen Jordan (FF)	Thomas Powell (FF)	Frank Fahy (FF)	Patrick Beegan (FF)	Gerald Bartley (FF)	Fred McDonogh (CnaG)	Patrick Hogan (CnaG)	Seán Broderick (CnaG)	Joseph Mongan (CnaG)
8th	1933	Stephen Jordan (FF)	Mark Killilea Snr (FF)	Frank Fahy (FF)	Patrick Beegan (FF)	Gerald Bartley (FF)	Séamus Keely (FF)	Patrick Hogan (CnaG)	Seán Broderick (CnaG)	Martin McDonogh (CnaG)
8th	1935 by-election	Stephen Jordan (FF)	Mark Killilea Snr (FF)	Frank Fahy (FF)	Patrick Beegan (FF)	Gerald Bartley (FF)	Séamus Keely (FF)	Patrick Hogan (CnaG)	Seán Broderick (CnaG)	Eamon Corbett (FF)
8th	1936 by-election	Stephen Jordan (FF)	Mark Killilea Snr (FF)	Frank Fahy (FF)	Patrick Beegan (FF)	Gerald Bartley (FF)	Séamus Keely (FF)	Martin Neilan (FF)	Seán Broderick (CnaG)	Eamon Corbett (FF)
9th	1937	Constituency abolished. See Galway East and Galway West								

Dáil	Election	Deputy (Party)	Deputy (Party)	Deputy (Party)	Deputy (Party)
9th	1937	Frank Fahy (FF)	Mark Killilea Snr (FF)	Patrick Beegan (FF)	Seán Broderick (FG)
10th	1938	Frank Fahy (FF)	Mark Killilea Snr (FF)	Patrick Beegan (FF)	Seán Broderick (FG)
11th	1943	Frank Fahy (FF)	Mark Killilea Snr (FF)	Patrick Beegan (FF)	Michael Donnellan (CnaT)
12th	1944	Frank Fahy (FF)	Mark Killilea Snr (FF)	Patrick Beegan (FF)	Michael Donnellan (CnaT)
13th	1948	Constituency abolished. See Galway North and Galway South			

Dáil	Election	Deputy (Party)	Deputy (Party)	Deputy (Party)	Deputy (Party)	Deputy (Party)
17th	1961	Michael F. Kitt (FF)	Anthony Millar (FF)	Michael Carty (FF)	Michael Donnellan (CnaT)	Brigid Hogan-O'Higgins (FG)
17th	1964 by-election	Michael F. Kitt (FF)	Anthony Millar (FF)	Michael Carty (FF)	John Donnellan (FG)	Brigid Hogan-O'Higgins (FG)
18th	1965	Michael F. Kitt (FF)	Anthony Millar (FF)	Michael Carty (FF)	John Donnellan (FG)	Brigid Hogan-O'Higgins (FG)
19th	1969	Constituency abolished. See Galway North-East and Clare–South Galway				

Dáil	Election	Deputy (Party)	Deputy (Party)	Deputy (Party)	Deputy (Party)
21st	1977	Johnny Callanan (FF)	Thomas Hussey (FF)	Mark Killilea Jnr (FF)	John Donnellan (FG)
22nd	1981	Johnny Callanan (FF)	Michael P. Kitt (FF)	Paul Connaughton Snr (FG)	3 seats 1981–1997
23rd	1982 (Feb)	Johnny Callanan (FF)	Michael P. Kitt (FF)	Paul Connaughton Snr (FG)	3 seats 1981–1997
23rd	1982 by-election	Noel Treacy (FF)	Michael P. Kitt (FF)	Paul Connaughton Snr (FG)	3 seats 1981–1997
24th	1982 (Nov)	Noel Treacy (FF)	Michael P. Kitt (FF)	Paul Connaughton Snr (FG)	3 seats 1981–1997
25th	1987	Noel Treacy (FF)	Michael P. Kitt (FF)	Paul Connaughton Snr (FG)	3 seats 1981–1997
26th	1989	Noel Treacy (FF)	Michael P. Kitt (FF)	Paul Connaughton Snr (FG)	3 seats 1981–1997
27th	1992	Noel Treacy (FF)	Michael P. Kitt (FF)	Paul Connaughton Snr (FG)	3 seats 1981–1997
28th	1997	Noel Treacy (FF)	Michael P. Kitt (FF)	Paul Connaughton Snr (FG)	Ulick Burke (FG)
29th	2002	Noel Treacy (FF)	Joe Callanan (FF)	Paul Connaughton Snr (FG)	Paddy McHugh (Ind.)
30th	2007	Noel Treacy (FF)	Michael P. Kitt (FF)	Paul Connaughton Snr (FG)	Ulick Burke (FG)
31st	2011	Colm Keaveney (Lab)	Michael P. Kitt (FF)	Ciarán Cannon (FG)	Paul Connaughton Jnr (FG)
32nd	2016	Seán Canney (Ind.)	Anne Rabbitte (FF)	Ciarán Cannon (FG)	3 seats 2016–2024
33rd	2020	Seán Canney (Ind.)	Anne Rabbitte (FF)	Ciarán Cannon (FG)	3 seats 2016–2024
34th	2024	Seán Canney (Ind.)	Albert Dolan (FF)	Peter Roche (FG)	Louis O'Hara (SF)

Dáil	Election	Deputy (Party)	Deputy (Party)	Deputy (Party)
13th	1948	Mark Killilea Snr (FF)	Michael F. Kitt (FF)	Michael Donnellan (CnaT)
14th	1951	Mark Killilea Snr (FF)	James Hession (FG)	Michael Donnellan (CnaT)
15th	1954	Mark Killilea Snr (FF)	James Hession (FG)	Michael Donnellan (CnaT)
16th	1957	Mark Killilea Snr (FF)	Michael F. Kitt (FF)	Michael Donnellan (CnaT)
17th	1961	Constituency abolished. See Galway East and Galway West		
