= Mellows =

Mellows is a surname. Notable people with the name include:

- Alfred Mellows DFC (1922–1997), English rower who competed for Great Britain in the 1948 Summer Olympics
- Anthony Mellows, OBE, TD (1936–2016), English solicitor, academic and part-time British Army officer
- Barney Mellows (1896–1942), Irish Sinn Féin politician, brother of Liam Mellows
- Liam Mellows (1892–1922), Irish republican and Sinn Féin politician, brother of Barney Mellows
- Mick Mellows, (born 1947), English footballer

== See also ==
- Mellows Bridge, a road bridge spanning the River Liffey in Dublin, Ireland
- Lillian Leach (1936–2013), American singer with the Bronx-based doo-wop group The Mellows
