= Louis O'Dea =

Irish politician (died 1955)

Senator
- In office 18 August 1944 – 21 April 1948
- Constituency: Cultural and Educational Panel

Teachta Dála
- In office August 1923 – June 1927
- Constituency: Galway

Personal details
- Born: County Galway, Ireland
- Died: 19 February 1955 County Galway, Ireland
- Party: Sinn Féin; Fianna Fáil

Louis Edward O'Dea (died 19 February 1955) was an Irish politician and solicitor. He was first elected to Dáil Éireann as a Sinn Féin Teachta Dála (TD) for the Galway constituency at the 1923 general election. He did not take his seat in the Dáil due to Sinn Féin's abstentionist policy. He did not contest June 1927 general election. He was an unsuccessful candidate for the Galway West constituency at the 1938 general election. In 1944 as a member of Fianna Fáil, he was elected to the 5th Seanad on the Cultural and Educational Panel.

Dáil	Election	Deputy (Party)	Deputy (Party)	Deputy (Party)	Deputy (Party)	Deputy (Party)	Deputy (Party)	Deputy (Party)	Deputy (Party)	Deputy (Party)
2nd	1921	Liam Mellows (SF)	Bryan Cusack (SF)	Frank Fahy (SF)	Joseph Whelehan (SF)	Pádraic Ó Máille (SF)	George Nicolls (SF)	Patrick Hogan (SF)	7 seats 1921–1923	
3rd	1922	Thomas O'Connell (Lab)	Bryan Cusack (AT-SF)	Frank Fahy (AT-SF)	Joseph Whelehan (PT-SF)	Pádraic Ó Máille (PT-SF)	George Nicolls (PT-SF)	Patrick Hogan (PT-SF)	7 seats 1921–1923	
4th	1923	Thomas O'Connell (Lab)	Barney Mellows (Rep)	Frank Fahy (Rep)	Louis O'Dea (Rep)	Pádraic Ó Máille (CnaG)	George Nicolls (CnaG)	Patrick Hogan (CnaG)	Seán Broderick (CnaG)	James Cosgrave (Ind.)
5th	1927 (Jun)	Gilbert Lynch (Lab)	Thomas Powell (FF)	Frank Fahy (Note: Frank Fahy served as Ceann Comhairle from 9 March 1932.) (FF)	Seán Tubridy (FF)	Mark Killilea Snr (FF)	Martin McDonogh (CnaG)	Patrick Hogan (CnaG)	Seán Broderick (CnaG)	William Duffy (NL)
6th	1927 (Sep)	Stephen Jordan (FF)	Thomas Powell (FF)	Frank Fahy (FF)	Seán Tubridy (FF)	Mark Killilea Snr (FF)	Martin McDonogh (CnaG)	Patrick Hogan (CnaG)	Seán Broderick (CnaG)	Joseph Mongan (CnaG)
7th	1932	Stephen Jordan (FF)	Thomas Powell (FF)	Frank Fahy (FF)	Patrick Beegan (FF)	Gerald Bartley (FF)	Fred McDonogh (CnaG)	Patrick Hogan (CnaG)	Seán Broderick (CnaG)	Joseph Mongan (CnaG)
8th	1933	Stephen Jordan (FF)	Mark Killilea Snr (FF)	Frank Fahy (FF)	Patrick Beegan (FF)	Gerald Bartley (FF)	Séamus Keely (FF)	Patrick Hogan (CnaG)	Seán Broderick (CnaG)	Martin McDonogh (CnaG)
8th	1935 by-election	Stephen Jordan (FF)	Mark Killilea Snr (FF)	Frank Fahy (FF)	Patrick Beegan (FF)	Gerald Bartley (FF)	Séamus Keely (FF)	Patrick Hogan (CnaG)	Seán Broderick (CnaG)	Eamon Corbett (FF)
8th	1936 by-election	Stephen Jordan (FF)	Mark Killilea Snr (FF)	Frank Fahy (FF)	Patrick Beegan (FF)	Gerald Bartley (FF)	Séamus Keely (FF)	Martin Neilan (FF)	Seán Broderick (CnaG)	Eamon Corbett (FF)
9th	1937	Constituency abolished. See Galway East and Galway West								
