= Galway (Dáil constituency) =

Dáil constituency (1921–1937)

- Former Dáil constituency
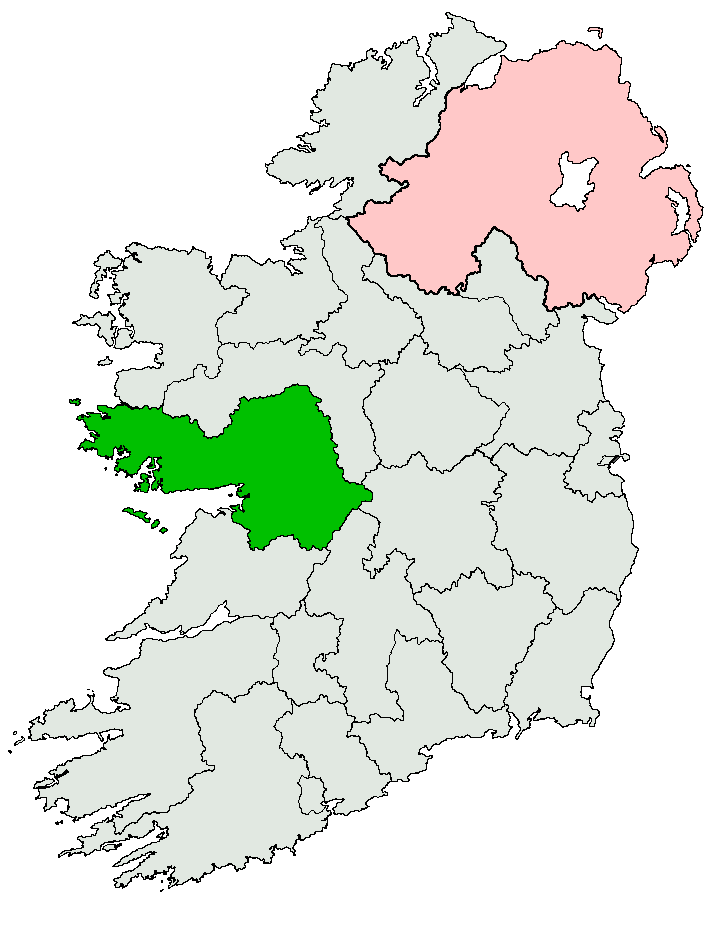
- Location of Galway within Ireland

Former constituency
- Created: 1921
- Abolished: 1937
- Seats: 7 (1921–1923); 9 (1923–1937)
- Local government area: County Galway
- Created from: Galway Connemara; East Galway; North Galway; South Galway
- Replaced by: Galway East; Galway West

Galway was a parliamentary constituency represented in Dáil Éireann, the lower house of the Irish parliament or Oireachtas from 1921 to 1937. The method of election was proportional representation by means of the single transferable vote (PR-STV).

== History ==
It was the largest constituency in Ireland, electing 7 deputies (Teachtaí Dála, commonly known as TDs) to the Dáil in 1921 and 1922, and 9 from 1923 to 1937. The constituency was created in 1921 as a 7-seat constituency, under the Government of Ireland Act 1920, for the 1921 elections to the House of Commons of Southern Ireland. That House had only a brief existence, as only four members took their seats, the remainder forming the Second Dáil.

Under the Electoral Act 1923, it became a 9-seat constituency for the 1923 general election to the 4th Dáil. Its representation remained at 9 seats until its abolition at the 1937 general election, under the Electoral (Revision of Constituencies) Act 1935.

== Boundaries ==
Galway was created as 7-seat constituency under the Government of Ireland Act 1920 succeeding the constituencies of Galway Connemara, East Galway, North Galway and South Galway, which had elected MPs to the House of Commons of the United Kingdom.

It became a 9-seat constituency in 1923, defined as:

"The administrative county of Galway."

It was abolished at the 1937 general election, replaced by the constituencies of Galway East (4 seats) and Galway West (4 seats).

== TDs ==
Teachtaí Dála (TDs) for Galway 1921–1937
Key to parties: CnaG = Cumann na nGaedheal; FF = Fianna Fáil; FG = Fine Gael; Ind. = Independent; Lab = Labour; NL = National League; Rep = Republican; SF = Sinn Féin; AT-SF = Sinn Féin (Anti-Treaty); PT-SF = Sinn Féin (Pro-Treaty)
Dáil	Election	Deputy (Party)	Deputy (Party)	Deputy (Party)	Deputy (Party)	Deputy (Party)	Deputy (Party)	Deputy (Party)	Deputy (Party)	Deputy (Party)
2nd	1921	Liam Mellows (SF)	Bryan Cusack (SF)	Frank Fahy (SF)	Joseph Whelehan (SF)	Pádraic Ó Máille (SF)	George Nicolls (SF)	Patrick Hogan (SF)	7 seats 1921–1923	
3rd	1922	Thomas O'Connell (Lab)	Bryan Cusack (AT-SF)	Frank Fahy (AT-SF)	Joseph Whelehan (PT-SF)	Pádraic Ó Máille (PT-SF)	George Nicolls (PT-SF)	Patrick Hogan (PT-SF)	7 seats 1921–1923	
4th	1923	Thomas O'Connell (Lab)	Barney Mellows (Rep)	Frank Fahy (Rep)	Louis O'Dea (Rep)	Pádraic Ó Máille (CnaG)	George Nicolls (CnaG)	Patrick Hogan (CnaG)	Seán Broderick (CnaG)	James Cosgrave (Ind.)
5th	1927 (Jun)	Gilbert Lynch (Lab)	Thomas Powell (FF)	Frank Fahy (Note: Frank Fahy served as Ceann Comhairle from 9 March 1932.) (FF)	Seán Tubridy (FF)	Mark Killilea Snr (FF)	Martin McDonogh (CnaG)	Patrick Hogan (CnaG)	Seán Broderick (CnaG)	William Duffy (NL)
6th	1927 (Sep)	Stephen Jordan (FF)	Thomas Powell (FF)	Frank Fahy (FF)	Seán Tubridy (FF)	Mark Killilea Snr (FF)	Martin McDonogh (CnaG)	Patrick Hogan (CnaG)	Seán Broderick (CnaG)	Joseph Mongan (CnaG)
7th	1932	Stephen Jordan (FF)	Thomas Powell (FF)	Frank Fahy (FF)	Patrick Beegan (FF)	Gerald Bartley (FF)	Fred McDonogh (CnaG)	Patrick Hogan (CnaG)	Seán Broderick (CnaG)	Joseph Mongan (CnaG)
8th	1933	Stephen Jordan (FF)	Mark Killilea Snr (FF)	Frank Fahy (FF)	Patrick Beegan (FF)	Gerald Bartley (FF)	Séamus Keely (FF)	Patrick Hogan (CnaG)	Seán Broderick (CnaG)	Martin McDonogh (CnaG)
8th	1935 by-election	Stephen Jordan (FF)	Mark Killilea Snr (FF)	Frank Fahy (FF)	Patrick Beegan (FF)	Gerald Bartley (FF)	Séamus Keely (FF)	Patrick Hogan (CnaG)	Seán Broderick (CnaG)	Eamon Corbett (FF)
8th	1936 by-election	Stephen Jordan (FF)	Mark Killilea Snr (FF)	Frank Fahy (FF)	Patrick Beegan (FF)	Gerald Bartley (FF)	Séamus Keely (FF)	Martin Neilan (FF)	Seán Broderick (CnaG)	Eamon Corbett (FF)
9th	1937	Constituency abolished. See Galway East and Galway West								

Note: The columns in this table are used only for presentational purposes, and no significance should be attached to the order of columns. For details of the order in which seats were won at each election, see the detailed results of that election.

== Elections ==
*: Outgoing TD

=== 1936 by-election ===
Following the death of Fine Gael TD Patrick Hogan, a by-election was held on 13 August 1936, and the seat was won by the Fianna Fáil candidate Martin Neilan.

1936 by-election: Galway
Party	Candidate	FPv%	Count	
Party	Candidate	FPv%	1	2
Fianna Fáil	Martin Neilan	60.6	39,982	
Fine Gael	James Hogan	35.3	23,264	25,073
Cumann Poblachta na hÉireann	George Noble Plunkett (Note: George Noble Plunkett stood as a joint Cumann Poblachta na hÉireann/Sinn Féin candidate.)	4.1	2,696	5,711
Electorate: 97,736 Valid: 65,942 Quota: 32,972 Turnout: 67.5%

=== 1935 by-election ===
Following the death of Fine Gael TD Martin McDonogh, a by-election was held on 19 June 1935.

1935 by-election: Galway
Party	Candidate	FPv%	Count
Party	Candidate	FPv%	1
Fianna Fáil	Eamon Corbett	60.8	37,415
Fine Gael	Thomas McDonogh	39.2	24,088
Electorate: 97,650 Valid: 61,503 Quota: 30,752 Turnout: 63.0%

=== 1933 general election ===
1933 general election: Galway
Party	Candidate	FPv%	Count											
Party	Candidate	FPv%	1	2	3	4	5	6	7	8	9	10	11	12
Fianna Fáil	Frank Fahy (Note: As outgoing Ceann Comhairle, Fahy was returned automatically under s. 2 of the Electoral (Amendment) Act 1927. He was elected again as Ceann Comhairle on 8 February 1933, leaving the Fianna Fáil parliamentary party.)	Automatically Returned	N/A											
Fianna Fáil	Mark Killilea Snr	12.2	8,872											
Fianna Fáil	Patrick Beegan	9.6	7,010	7,220	7,659	7,674	7,686	7,686	7,696	7,701	7,788	10,119		
Fianna Fáil	Gerald Bartley	8.7	6,358	6,380	6,656	6,662	6,690	6,691	6,892	6,932	11,318			
Fianna Fáil	Séamus Keely	8.5	6,197	6,232	6,414	6,448	6,468	6,468	6,472	6,482	6,679	7,126	8,448	
Fianna Fáil	Stephen Jordan	7.9	5,770	5,922	6,489	6,535	6,612	6,619	6,634	6,649	6,823	6,977	7,539	7,850
Fianna Fáil	Thomas Powell	7.8	5,687	5,977	6,422	6,427	6,514	6,517	6,552	6,559	7,416	7,686	7,789	7,821
Fianna Fáil	Seán Tubridy	7.7	5,634	5,649	5,786	5,789	5,797	5,799	5,873	5,889				
Cumann na nGaedheal	Patrick Hogan	6.8	4,940	4,945	5,176	8,051	8,444							
Cumann na nGaedheal	Martin McDonogh	5.9	4,328	4,329	4,555	4,635	5,409	5,511	9,321					
Cumann na nGaedheal	Joseph Mongan	5.8	4,198	4,201	4,224	4,236	4,382	4,417						
Cumann na nGaedheal	Seán Broderick	5.7	4,167	4,176	4,279	4,410	6,533	6,722	6,884	8,007	8,039	8,050	8,077	8,077
Cumann na nGaedheal	Fred McDonogh	4.9	3,574	3,585	3,813	3,838								
Cumann na nGaedheal	Patrick Cawley	4.3	3,129	3,130	3,267									
Labour	Robert Malachy Burke	4.2	3,080	3,093										
Electorate: 94,591 Valid: 72,944 Quota: 8,105 Turnout: 77.1%

=== 1932 general election ===
1932 general election: Galway
Party	Candidate	FPv%	Count												
Party	Candidate	FPv%	1	2	3	4	5	6	7	8	9	10	11	12	13
Fianna Fáil	Frank Fahy (Note: Fahy was elected as Ceann Comhairle on 9 March 1932, leaving the Fianna Fáil parliamentary party.)	9.3	6,132	6,187	6,245	6,525	6,728								
Fianna Fáil	Thomas Powell	9.2	6,068	6,162	6,174	6,685									
Cumann na nGaedheal	Patrick Hogan	8.4	5,551	5,617	5,681	5,839	8,489								
Fianna Fáil	Mark Killilea Snr	8.2	5,454	5,458	5,475	5,545	5,550	5,555	5,560	5,571	5,729	5,816	5,924	5,955	5,962
Fianna Fáil	Patrick Beegan	7.9	5,230	5,236	5,331	5,583	5,598	5,600	5,614	5,620	5,697	6,871			
Fianna Fáil	Stephen Jordan	7.8	5,142	5,153	5,174	5,348	5,369	5,382	5,400	5,443	5,661	5,771	5,981	6,207	6,215
Cumann na nGaedheal	Fred McDonogh	7.4	4,926	4,955	4,974	5,077	5,208	5,209	5,372	5,376	5,385	5,388	6,037	6,037	6,352
Cumann na nGaedheal	Joseph Mongan	7.0	4,658	4,692	4,715	4,746	4,781	4,781	4,837	4,840	4,972	4,987	6,944		
Cumann na nGaedheal	Seán Broderick	6.6	4,397	4,410	4,420	4,467	4,558	4,558	6,052	6,073	6,082	6,088	6,763		
Fianna Fáil	Gerald Bartley	6.6	4,357	4,456	4,486	4,574	4,584	4,591	4,600	4,610	8,019				
Fianna Fáil	Seán Tubridy	6.1	4,020	4,107	4,110	4,169	4,173	4,210	4,212	4,219					
Cumann na nGaedheal	Martin McDonogh	5.1	3,384	3,642	3,674	4,050	4,121	4,127	4,241	4,250	4,312	4,322			
Cumann na nGaedheal	Patrick Lambert	4.9	3,261	3,269	3,277	3,303									
Labour	Frank Kelly	2.3	1,533	1,705	2,348										
Labour	Edward Meehan	1.6	1,036	1,047											
Independent	Martin Cooke	1.5	987												
Electorate: 91,746 Valid: 66,136 Quota: 6,614 Turnout: 72.1%

=== September 1927 general election ===
September 1927 general election: Galway
Party	Candidate	FPv%	Count											
Party	Candidate	FPv%	1	2	3	4	5	6	7	8	9	10	11	12
Cumann na nGaedheal	Patrick Hogan	10.2	6,059											
Cumann na nGaedheal	Seán Broderick	8.8	5,236	5,295	5,480	7,180								
Fianna Fáil	Seán Tubridy	8.6	5,126	5,473	5,482	5,499	5,499	5,501	5,520	5,520	5,594	5,637	5,891	6,255
Cumann na nGaedheal	Martin McDonogh	8.4	5,007	5,239	5,448	5,768	5,808	6,078						
Fianna Fáil	Frank Fahy	8.0	4,780	4,919	5,659	5,731	5,737	5,757	8,027					
Fianna Fáil	Mark Killilea Snr	7.8	4,675	4,730	4,808	4,888	4,889	4,899	5,300	5,301	6,610			
Fianna Fáil	Thomas Powell	7.6	4,551	4,744	4,756	4,792	4,792	4,792	4,818	4,818	4,919	5,387	6,579	
Cumann na nGaedheal	Joseph Mongan	7.1	4,208	4,415	4,438	4,597	4,626	5,376	5,390	5,453	5,461	5,462	5,865	5,892
Cumann na nGaedheal	James Nestor	6.6	3,944	4,021	4,077	4,265	4,272	4,396	4,415	4,460	4,470	4,472	4,818	4,835
Fianna Fáil	Stephen Jordan	5.8	3,448	3,516	3,592	3,614	3,617	3,623	3,765	3,766	4,169	4,263	5,005	5,210
Labour	Gilbert Lynch	4.9	2,912	3,065	3,443	3,642	3,647	3,677	3,857	3,859	4,015	4,051		
Fianna Fáil	Séamus Keely	4.9	2,898	2,906	3,174	3,209	3,211	3,213						
Cumann na nGaedheal	Andrew Staunton	4.5	2,680	2,703	2,972									
Independent	James Cosgrave	4.0	2,399	2,499										
Independent	Pádraic Ó Máille	2.9	1,732											
Electorate: 101,256 Valid: 59,655 Quota: 5,966 Turnout: 58.9%

=== June 1927 general election ===
June 1927 general election: Galway
Party	Candidate	FPv%	Count															
Party	Candidate	FPv%	1	2	3	4	5	6	7	8	9	10	11	12	13	14	15	16
Cumann na nGaedheal	Patrick Hogan	9.6	5,564	5,636	5,773	6,550												
Fianna Fáil	Mark Killilea Snr	7.5	4,349	4,363	4,419	4,420	4,448	4,555	4,629	5,671	6,071							
Fianna Fáil	Seán Tubridy	7.4	4,287	4,328	4,347	4,351	4,351	4,359	4,620	4,633	4,656	4,666	4,690	4,722	4,731	4,750	4,756	5,441
Cumann na nGaedheal	Seán Broderick	6.8	3,906	4,009	4,139	4,209	4,643	4,786	4,880	4,969	4,985	4,989	5,267	6,241				
Cumann na nGaedheal	Joseph Mongan	5.6	3,245	3,295	3,305	3,330	3,350	3,380	3,664	3,679	3,682	3,682	3,708	3,886	3,965	4,046	4,135	4,193
Cumann na nGaedheal	Martin McDonogh	5.6	3,244	3,556	3,694	3,747	3,813	4,158	4,510	4,547	4,566	4,570	4,894	5,391	5,669	5,983		
Fianna Fáil	Frank Fahy	5.5	3,150	3,200	3,234	3,263	3,269	3,327	3,487	4,012	5,595	5,798						
Fianna Fáil	Thomas Powell	5.4	3,136	3,316	3,418	3,422	3,422	3,445	3,560	3,589	3,629	3,646	3,704	3,783	3,797	3,856	3,860	5,366
Labour	Gilbert Lynch	4.6	2,654	2,763	2,797	2,960	2,982	3,080	3,200	3,250	3,312	3,329	3,481	3,700	3,732	4,120	4,139	4,380
Sinn Féin	Barney Mellows	4.4	2,546	2,636	2,669	2,701	2,702	2,732	2,819	3,043	3,097	3,123	3,447	3,497	3,504	3,695	3,706	
Cumann na nGaedheal	James Nestor	4.2	2,433	2,459	2,554	2,568	2,595	2,927	3,014	3,026	3,033	3,034	3,102					
Fianna Fáil	Stephen Jordan	3.9	2,241	2,262	2,287	2,295	2,296	2,349	2,370									
Fianna Fáil	Bryan Cusack	3.8	2,212	2,267	2,274	2,336	2,357	2,370	2,399	2,509								
Farmers' Party	Patrick Lambert	3.5	2,031	2,061	2,516	2,546	2,554	2,634	2,693	2,764	2,777	2,777						
National League	William Duffy	3.5	2,003	2,083	2,158	2,216	2,240	2,543	2,673	2,744	2,854	2,858	3,681	3,778	3,790	5,333	5,377	5,656
National League	James Cosgrave	3.4	1,991	2,043	2,069	2,449	2,552	2,706	2,773	2,800	2,910	2,920	3,136	3,234	3,269			
Cumann na nGaedheal	John McKeague	3.2	1,832	1,840	1,849													
Clann Éireann	Pádraic Ó Máille	3.1	1,809	1,936	2,035	2,064	2,071	2,157										
National League	James McDonald	3.1	1,795	1,850	2,050	2,061	2,068											
Farmers' Party	John Ronaldson	2.8	1,637	1,781														
Independent	Seamus O'Mulloy	2.1	1,216															
National League	James Reddington	0.8	464															
Electorate: 101,256 Valid: 57,745 Quota: 5,775 Turnout: 57.0%

=== 1923 general election ===
Full figures for the fifth through to the eighteenth counts are unavailable.

1923 general election: Galway
Party	Candidate	FPv%	Count																		
Party	Candidate	FPv%	1	2	3	4	5	6	7	8	9	10	11	12	13	14	15	16	17	18	19
Cumann na nGaedheal	Patrick Hogan	15.6	7,563																		
Republican	Barney Mellows	14.7	7,131																		
Cumann na nGaedheal	Pádraic Ó Máille	13.6	6,570																		
Republican	Frank Fahy	11.7	5,670																		
Republican	Colm Ó Gaora	4.2	2,011	2,019	2,575	2,606	N/A	N/A	N/A	N/A	N/A	N/A	N/A	N/A	N/A	N/A	N/A	N/A	N/A	N/A	3,340
Independent	James Cosgrave	4.0	1,922	2,082	2,113	2,131	N/A	N/A	N/A	N/A	N/A	N/A	N/A	N/A	N/A	N/A	N/A	N/A	N/A	N/A	3,495
Labour	Thomas J. O'Connell	3.8	1,862	2,019	2,088	2,209	N/A	N/A	N/A	N/A	N/A	N/A	N/A	N/A	N/A	N/A	N/A	N/A	N/A	N/A	4,039
Cumann na nGaedheal	Seán Broderick	3.8	1,847	2,077	2,081	2,148	N/A	N/A	N/A	N/A	N/A	N/A	N/A	N/A	N/A	N/A	N/A	N/A	N/A	N/A	4,648
Cumann na nGaedheal	George Nicolls	3.6	1,732	2,688	2,725	3,487	N/A	N/A	N/A	N/A	N/A	N/A	N/A	N/A	N/A	N/A	4,920				
Farmers' Party	Patrick Conroy	3.2	1,529	1,554	1,567	1,735															
Farmers' Party	Martin Egan	3.1	1,497	1,709	1,732	1,749															
Republican	Louis O'Dea	2.9	1,413	1,436	2,861	2,911	N/A	N/A	N/A	N/A	N/A	N/A	N/A	N/A	N/A	N/A	N/A	N/A	N/A	N/A	4,338
Town Tenants' Association	Thomas Sloyan	2.6	1,246	1,320	1,333	1,373															
Cumann na nGaedheal	William Dolly	2.6	1,237	1,345	1,349	1,388															
Labour	John McNally	2.1	1,028	1,154	1,182	1,201															
Cumann na nGaedheal	John Quinn	1.7	837	958	960	1,050															
Cumann na nGaedheal	Michael Tierney	1.4	667	867	870	943															
Unpurchased Tenants' Association	James Hoban	1.3	622	651	659	679															
Farmers' Party	Martin Finnerty	1.3	615	711	729	738															
Cumann na nGaedheal	Patrick Curley	0.8	379	457	462	476															
Farmers' Party	James Haverty	0.7	343	371	390	397															
Cumann na nGaedheal	Thomas Dillon	0.6	293	349	352	516															
Farmers' Party	Michael O'Brien	0.4	204	229	244	259															
Independent	Anthony Fallon	0.3	157	170	187	195															
Electorate: 106,378 Valid: 48,375 Quota: 4,838 Turnout: 45.5%

=== 1922 general election ===
1922 general election: Galway
Party	Candidate	FPv%	Count						
Party	Candidate	FPv%	1	2	3	4	5	6	7
Sinn Féin (Pro-Treaty)	Patrick Hogan	18.7	6,832						
Sinn Féin (Pro-Treaty)	Pádraic Ó Máille	17.7	6,445						
Labour	Thomas J. O'Connell	13.2	4,821						
Sinn Féin (Anti-Treaty)	Bryan Cusack	12.1	4,425	4,510	4,725				
Sinn Féin (Pro-Treaty)	Joseph Whelehan	11.9	4,361	4,667					
Sinn Féin (Anti-Treaty)	Liam Mellows	10.8	3,937	4,076	4,347	4,423	4,454	4,521	4,540
Sinn Féin (Anti-Treaty)	Frank Fahy	9.4	3,418	3,821	4,018	4,200	4,273	4,436	4,579
Sinn Féin (Pro-Treaty)	George Nicolls	6.2	2,258	3,594	4,793				
Electorate: 81,455 Valid: 36,497 Quota: 4,563 Turnout: 44.8%

=== 1921 general election ===
1921 general election: Galway (uncontested)
Party	Candidate
Sinn Féin	Bryan Cusack
Sinn Féin	Frank Fahy
Sinn Féin	Patrick Hogan
Sinn Féin	Liam Mellows
Sinn Féin	George Nicolls
Sinn Féin	Pádraic Ó Máille
Sinn Féin	Joseph Whelehan

== See also ==
- Dáil constituencies
- Politics of the Republic of Ireland
- Historic Dáil constituencies
- Elections in the Republic of Ireland
