= Séamus Keely =

Irish Fianna Fáil politician (1889–1974)

Teachta Dála
- In office January 1933 – July 1937
- Constituency: Galway

Personal details
- Born: 28 December 1889 County Galway, Ireland
- Died: 20 March 1974 (aged 84) County Galway, Ireland
- Party: Fianna Fáil

Séamus P. Keely (28 December 1889 – 20 March 1974) was an Irish Fianna Fáil politician. He was elected to Dáil Éireann as a Fianna Fáil Teachta Dála (TD) for the Galway constituency at the 1933 general election. He unsuccessfully contested the 1937 general election as a Fianna Fáil candidate in the Clare constituency.

Dáil	Election	Deputy (Party)	Deputy (Party)	Deputy (Party)	Deputy (Party)	Deputy (Party)	Deputy (Party)	Deputy (Party)	Deputy (Party)	Deputy (Party)
2nd	1921	Liam Mellows (SF)	Bryan Cusack (SF)	Frank Fahy (SF)	Joseph Whelehan (SF)	Pádraic Ó Máille (SF)	George Nicolls (SF)	Patrick Hogan (SF)	7 seats 1921–1923	
3rd	1922	Thomas O'Connell (Lab)	Bryan Cusack (AT-SF)	Frank Fahy (AT-SF)	Joseph Whelehan (PT-SF)	Pádraic Ó Máille (PT-SF)	George Nicolls (PT-SF)	Patrick Hogan (PT-SF)	7 seats 1921–1923	
4th	1923	Thomas O'Connell (Lab)	Barney Mellows (Rep)	Frank Fahy (Rep)	Louis O'Dea (Rep)	Pádraic Ó Máille (CnaG)	George Nicolls (CnaG)	Patrick Hogan (CnaG)	Seán Broderick (CnaG)	James Cosgrave (Ind.)
5th	1927 (Jun)	Gilbert Lynch (Lab)	Thomas Powell (FF)	Frank Fahy (Note: Frank Fahy served as Ceann Comhairle from 9 March 1932.) (FF)	Seán Tubridy (FF)	Mark Killilea Snr (FF)	Martin McDonogh (CnaG)	Patrick Hogan (CnaG)	Seán Broderick (CnaG)	William Duffy (NL)
6th	1927 (Sep)	Stephen Jordan (FF)	Thomas Powell (FF)	Frank Fahy (FF)	Seán Tubridy (FF)	Mark Killilea Snr (FF)	Martin McDonogh (CnaG)	Patrick Hogan (CnaG)	Seán Broderick (CnaG)	Joseph Mongan (CnaG)
7th	1932	Stephen Jordan (FF)	Thomas Powell (FF)	Frank Fahy (FF)	Patrick Beegan (FF)	Gerald Bartley (FF)	Fred McDonogh (CnaG)	Patrick Hogan (CnaG)	Seán Broderick (CnaG)	Joseph Mongan (CnaG)
8th	1933	Stephen Jordan (FF)	Mark Killilea Snr (FF)	Frank Fahy (FF)	Patrick Beegan (FF)	Gerald Bartley (FF)	Séamus Keely (FF)	Patrick Hogan (CnaG)	Seán Broderick (CnaG)	Martin McDonogh (CnaG)
8th	1935 by-election	Stephen Jordan (FF)	Mark Killilea Snr (FF)	Frank Fahy (FF)	Patrick Beegan (FF)	Gerald Bartley (FF)	Séamus Keely (FF)	Patrick Hogan (CnaG)	Seán Broderick (CnaG)	Eamon Corbett (FF)
8th	1936 by-election	Stephen Jordan (FF)	Mark Killilea Snr (FF)	Frank Fahy (FF)	Patrick Beegan (FF)	Gerald Bartley (FF)	Séamus Keely (FF)	Martin Neilan (FF)	Seán Broderick (CnaG)	Eamon Corbett (FF)
9th	1937	Constituency abolished. See Galway East and Galway West								
