= George Nicolls =

Irish politician (1884–1942)

- Nicolls, c.1910s

Parliamentary Secretary
- 1925–1927: Defence

Teachta Dála
- In office May 1921 – June 1927
- Constituency: Galway

Personal details
- Born: 1884 Dublin, Ireland
- Died: 11 May 1942 (aged 57–58) Dublin, Ireland
- Party: Sinn Féin; Cumann na nGaedheal
- Spouse: Margaret MacHugh (m. 1914)
- Education: Royal University of Ireland

George Nicolls (1884 – 11 May 1942) was an Irish politician and solicitor. In the lead-up to the 1916 Easter Rising, a rebel plan for Galway town was prepared at Nicolls' home at 2 University Road. He was arrested in Galway on Easter Tuesday before the local Irish Volunteers could be mobilised. He spent most of the period from 1916 to 1921 in prison in England.

He was first elected unopposed at the 1921 elections for the Galway constituency as a Sinn Féin Teachta Dála (TD) to the Second Dáil while still imprisoned. In January 1922, he was appointed Assistant Minister for Home Affairs in the Government of the 2nd Dáil.

Following the Anglo-Irish Treaty, he sided with Michael Collins and voted in favour of it. He was re-elected at the 1922 general election as a pro-Treaty Sinn Féin TD. At the 1923 general election, he was re-elected as a Cumann na nGaedheal TD. In the 4th Dáil, he was appointed as Parliamentary Secretary to the Minister for Defence and served from January 1925 to May 1927. He did not stand at the June 1927 general election.

Nicolls was married in Dublin in December 1914 to Margaret MacHugh.

== Intelligence files ==
British Army military intelligence file for George Nicholls

Prosecution of George Nicholls; Possession of Seditious Documents

Political offices
New office	Parliamentary Secretary to the Minister for Defence; 1925–1927	Succeeded by Eamonn Duggan

Dáil	Election	Deputy (Party)	Deputy (Party)	Deputy (Party)	Deputy (Party)	Deputy (Party)	Deputy (Party)	Deputy (Party)	Deputy (Party)	Deputy (Party)
2nd	1921	Liam Mellows (SF)	Bryan Cusack (SF)	Frank Fahy (SF)	Joseph Whelehan (SF)	Pádraic Ó Máille (SF)	George Nicolls (SF)	Patrick Hogan (SF)	7 seats 1921–1923	
3rd	1922	Thomas O'Connell (Lab)	Bryan Cusack (AT-SF)	Frank Fahy (AT-SF)	Joseph Whelehan (PT-SF)	Pádraic Ó Máille (PT-SF)	George Nicolls (PT-SF)	Patrick Hogan (PT-SF)	7 seats 1921–1923	
4th	1923	Thomas O'Connell (Lab)	Barney Mellows (Rep)	Frank Fahy (Rep)	Louis O'Dea (Rep)	Pádraic Ó Máille (CnaG)	George Nicolls (CnaG)	Patrick Hogan (CnaG)	Seán Broderick (CnaG)	James Cosgrave (Ind.)
5th	1927 (Jun)	Gilbert Lynch (Lab)	Thomas Powell (FF)	Frank Fahy (Note: Frank Fahy served as Ceann Comhairle from 9 March 1932.) (FF)	Seán Tubridy (FF)	Mark Killilea Snr (FF)	Martin McDonogh (CnaG)	Patrick Hogan (CnaG)	Seán Broderick (CnaG)	William Duffy (NL)
6th	1927 (Sep)	Stephen Jordan (FF)	Thomas Powell (FF)	Frank Fahy (FF)	Seán Tubridy (FF)	Mark Killilea Snr (FF)	Martin McDonogh (CnaG)	Patrick Hogan (CnaG)	Seán Broderick (CnaG)	Joseph Mongan (CnaG)
7th	1932	Stephen Jordan (FF)	Thomas Powell (FF)	Frank Fahy (FF)	Patrick Beegan (FF)	Gerald Bartley (FF)	Fred McDonogh (CnaG)	Patrick Hogan (CnaG)	Seán Broderick (CnaG)	Joseph Mongan (CnaG)
8th	1933	Stephen Jordan (FF)	Mark Killilea Snr (FF)	Frank Fahy (FF)	Patrick Beegan (FF)	Gerald Bartley (FF)	Séamus Keely (FF)	Patrick Hogan (CnaG)	Seán Broderick (CnaG)	Martin McDonogh (CnaG)
8th	1935 by-election	Stephen Jordan (FF)	Mark Killilea Snr (FF)	Frank Fahy (FF)	Patrick Beegan (FF)	Gerald Bartley (FF)	Séamus Keely (FF)	Patrick Hogan (CnaG)	Seán Broderick (CnaG)	Eamon Corbett (FF)
8th	1936 by-election	Stephen Jordan (FF)	Mark Killilea Snr (FF)	Frank Fahy (FF)	Patrick Beegan (FF)	Gerald Bartley (FF)	Séamus Keely (FF)	Martin Neilan (FF)	Seán Broderick (CnaG)	Eamon Corbett (FF)
9th	1937	Constituency abolished. See Galway East and Galway West								
