= Gerald Bartley =

Irish politician (1898–1975)

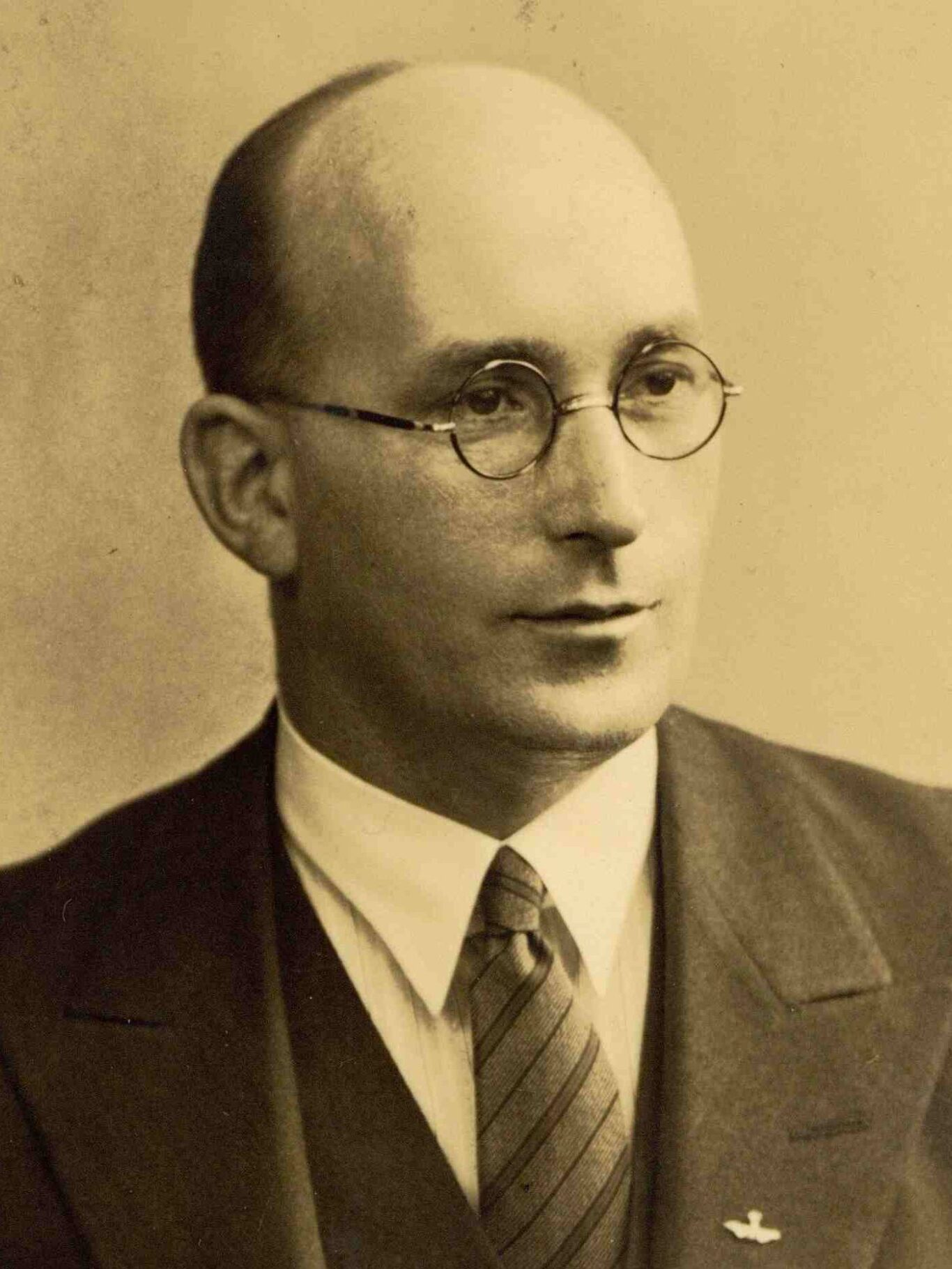
- Bartley, c. 1930s

Minister for Defence
- In office 11 October 1961 – 21 April 1965
- Taoiseach: Seán Lemass
- Preceded by: Kevin Boland
- Succeeded by: Michael Hilliard

Minister for the Gaeltacht
- In office 23 July 1959 – 11 October 1961
- Taoiseach: Seán Lemass
- Preceded by: Mícheál Ó Móráin
- Succeeded by: Mícheál Ó Móráin

Parliamentary Secretary
- 1958–1959: Finance
- 1957–1958: Industry and Commerce
- 1951–1954: Agriculture

Teachta Dála
- In office July 1937 – April 1965
- Constituency: Galway West
- In office February 1932 – July 1937
- Constituency: Galway

Personal details
- Born: 12 June 1898 County Mayo, Ireland
- Died: 18 April 1975 (aged 76) Clifden, County Galway, Ireland
- Party: Fianna Fáil
- Spouse: Bridget Monnelly (m. 1935)
- Education: O'Connell School

Gerald Bartley (12 June 1898 – 18 April 1975) was an Irish Fianna Fáil politician who served as Minister for the Gaeltacht and Minister for Defence from 1959 to 1965. He was a TD for the Galway and Galway West constituencies from 1932 until his retirement in 1965.

Bartley was born in Cloghan, County Mayo. He was the son of Royal Irish Constabulary (RIC) Sergeant John Bartley and Anne Costelloe, a grocer. His family later settled in Clifden, County Galway. He was educated at the O'Connell School in Dublin.

He joined the Irish Volunteers in 1914. He served with the West Connemara Brigade flying column from early 1921 during the Irish War of Independence, was promoted to vice-brigadier of the West Connemara Brigade of the Irish Republican Army (IRA) in the Truce period, took the anti-Treaty side in the Civil War, was involved in a number of attacks on National Army troops and was captured by the Free State Government in October 1922 and interned until June 1924.

In 1925 Bartley was elected to Galway County Council and served as chairman of the finance committee before his election to Dáil Éireann. Bartley was later awarded a pension by the Irish government under the Military Service Pensions Act, 1934 for his service with the Irish Volunteers and the IRA between 1917 and 1923.

For almost twenty years Bartley remained as a backbench TD before his first government appointment as Parliamentary Secretary to the Minister for Agriculture in 1951. On returning to government in 1957, Bartley was appointed Parliamentary Secretary to the Minister for Industry and Commerce. He was moved to the position of Parliamentary Secretary to the Minister for Finance the following year before joining the cabinet as Minister for the Gaeltacht in 1959. Two years later Bartley became Minister for Defence, a post he held until his retirement from politics in 1965.

Political offices
New office	Parliamentary Secretary to the Minister for Agriculture; 1951–1954	Succeeded by Oliver J. Flanagan
Preceded by Patrick Crotty	Parliamentary Secretary to the Minister for Industry and Commerce; 1957–1958	Succeeded by Michael Hilliard
Preceded by Patrick Beegan	Parliamentary Secretary to the Minister for Finance; 1958–1959	Succeeded by Joseph Brennan
Preceded by Mícheál Ó Móráin	Minister for the Gaeltacht; 1959–1961	Succeeded by Mícheál Ó Móráin
Preceded by Kevin Boland	Minister for Defence; 1961–1965	Succeeded by Michael Hilliard

Dáil	Election	Deputy (Party)	Deputy (Party)	Deputy (Party)	Deputy (Party)	Deputy (Party)	Deputy (Party)	Deputy (Party)	Deputy (Party)	Deputy (Party)
2nd	1921	Liam Mellows (SF)	Bryan Cusack (SF)	Frank Fahy (SF)	Joseph Whelehan (SF)	Pádraic Ó Máille (SF)	George Nicolls (SF)	Patrick Hogan (SF)	7 seats 1921–1923	
3rd	1922	Thomas O'Connell (Lab)	Bryan Cusack (AT-SF)	Frank Fahy (AT-SF)	Joseph Whelehan (PT-SF)	Pádraic Ó Máille (PT-SF)	George Nicolls (PT-SF)	Patrick Hogan (PT-SF)	7 seats 1921–1923	
4th	1923	Thomas O'Connell (Lab)	Barney Mellows (Rep)	Frank Fahy (Rep)	Louis O'Dea (Rep)	Pádraic Ó Máille (CnaG)	George Nicolls (CnaG)	Patrick Hogan (CnaG)	Seán Broderick (CnaG)	James Cosgrave (Ind.)
5th	1927 (Jun)	Gilbert Lynch (Lab)	Thomas Powell (FF)	Frank Fahy (Note: Frank Fahy served as Ceann Comhairle from 9 March 1932.) (FF)	Seán Tubridy (FF)	Mark Killilea Snr (FF)	Martin McDonogh (CnaG)	Patrick Hogan (CnaG)	Seán Broderick (CnaG)	William Duffy (NL)
6th	1927 (Sep)	Stephen Jordan (FF)	Thomas Powell (FF)	Frank Fahy (FF)	Seán Tubridy (FF)	Mark Killilea Snr (FF)	Martin McDonogh (CnaG)	Patrick Hogan (CnaG)	Seán Broderick (CnaG)	Joseph Mongan (CnaG)
7th	1932	Stephen Jordan (FF)	Thomas Powell (FF)	Frank Fahy (FF)	Patrick Beegan (FF)	Gerald Bartley (FF)	Fred McDonogh (CnaG)	Patrick Hogan (CnaG)	Seán Broderick (CnaG)	Joseph Mongan (CnaG)
8th	1933	Stephen Jordan (FF)	Mark Killilea Snr (FF)	Frank Fahy (FF)	Patrick Beegan (FF)	Gerald Bartley (FF)	Séamus Keely (FF)	Patrick Hogan (CnaG)	Seán Broderick (CnaG)	Martin McDonogh (CnaG)
8th	1935 by-election	Stephen Jordan (FF)	Mark Killilea Snr (FF)	Frank Fahy (FF)	Patrick Beegan (FF)	Gerald Bartley (FF)	Séamus Keely (FF)	Patrick Hogan (CnaG)	Seán Broderick (CnaG)	Eamon Corbett (FF)
8th	1936 by-election	Stephen Jordan (FF)	Mark Killilea Snr (FF)	Frank Fahy (FF)	Patrick Beegan (FF)	Gerald Bartley (FF)	Séamus Keely (FF)	Martin Neilan (FF)	Seán Broderick (CnaG)	Eamon Corbett (FF)
9th	1937	Constituency abolished. See Galway East and Galway West								

Dáil	Election	Deputy (Party)	Deputy (Party)	Deputy (Party)	Deputy (Party)	Deputy (Party)
9th	1937	Gerald Bartley (FF)	Joseph Mongan (FG)	Seán Tubridy (FF)	3 seats 1937–1977	
10th	1938	Gerald Bartley (FF)	Joseph Mongan (FG)	Seán Tubridy (FF)	3 seats 1937–1977	
10th	1940 by-election	Gerald Bartley (FF)	Joseph Mongan (FG)	John J. Keane (FF)	3 seats 1937–1977	
11th	1943	Gerald Bartley (FF)	Joseph Mongan (FG)	Eamon Corbett (FF)	3 seats 1937–1977	
12th	1944	Gerald Bartley (FF)	Joseph Mongan (FG)	Michael Lydon (FF)	3 seats 1937–1977	
13th	1948	Gerald Bartley (FF)	Joseph Mongan (FG)	Michael Lydon (FF)	3 seats 1937–1977	
14th	1951	Gerald Bartley (FF)	John Mannion Snr (FG)	Peadar Duignan (FF)	3 seats 1937–1977	
15th	1954	Gerald Bartley (FF)	Fintan Coogan Snr (FG)	Johnny Geoghegan (FF)	3 seats 1937–1977	
16th	1957	Gerald Bartley (FF)	Fintan Coogan Snr (FG)	Johnny Geoghegan (FF)	3 seats 1937–1977	
17th	1961	Gerald Bartley (FF)	Fintan Coogan Snr (FG)	Johnny Geoghegan (FF)	3 seats 1937–1977	
18th	1965	Bobby Molloy (FF)	Fintan Coogan Snr (FG)	Johnny Geoghegan (FF)	3 seats 1937–1977	
19th	1969	Bobby Molloy (FF)	Fintan Coogan Snr (FG)	Johnny Geoghegan (FF)	3 seats 1937–1977	
20th	1973	Bobby Molloy (FF)	Fintan Coogan Snr (FG)	Johnny Geoghegan (FF)	3 seats 1937–1977	
20th	1975 by-election	Bobby Molloy (FF)	Fintan Coogan Snr (FG)	Máire Geoghegan-Quinn (FF)	3 seats 1937–1977	
21st	1977	Bobby Molloy (FF)	John Mannion Jnr (FG)	Máire Geoghegan-Quinn (FF)	Bill Loughnane (FF)	4 seats 1977–1981
22nd	1981	Bobby Molloy (FF)	John Donnellan (FG)	Máire Geoghegan-Quinn (FF)	Mark Killilea Jnr (FF)	Michael D. Higgins (Lab)
23rd	1982 (Feb)	Bobby Molloy (FF)	John Donnellan (FG)	Máire Geoghegan-Quinn (FF)	Frank Fahey (FF)	Michael D. Higgins (Lab)
24th	1982 (Nov)	Bobby Molloy (FF)	John Donnellan (FG)	Máire Geoghegan-Quinn (FF)	Frank Fahey (FF)	Fintan Coogan Jnr (FG)
25th	1987	Bobby Molloy (PDs)	John Donnellan (FG)	Máire Geoghegan-Quinn (FF)	Frank Fahey (FF)	Michael D. Higgins (Lab)
26th	1989	Bobby Molloy (PDs)	Pádraic McCormack (FG)	Máire Geoghegan-Quinn (FF)	Frank Fahey (FF)	Michael D. Higgins (Lab)
27th	1992	Bobby Molloy (PDs)	Pádraic McCormack (FG)	Máire Geoghegan-Quinn (FF)	Éamon Ó Cuív (FF)	Michael D. Higgins (Lab)
28th	1997	Bobby Molloy (PDs)	Pádraic McCormack (FG)	Frank Fahey (FF)	Éamon Ó Cuív (FF)	Michael D. Higgins (Lab)
29th	2002	Noel Grealish (PDs)	Pádraic McCormack (FG)	Frank Fahey (FF)	Éamon Ó Cuív (FF)	Michael D. Higgins (Lab)
30th	2007	Noel Grealish (PDs)	Pádraic McCormack (FG)	Frank Fahey (FF)	Éamon Ó Cuív (FF)	Michael D. Higgins (Lab)
31st	2011	Noel Grealish (Ind.)	Brian Walsh (FG)	Seán Kyne (FG)	Éamon Ó Cuív (FF)	Derek Nolan (Lab)
32nd	2016	Noel Grealish (Ind.)	Hildegarde Naughton (FG)	Seán Kyne (FG)	Éamon Ó Cuív (FF)	Catherine Connolly (Ind.)
33rd	2020	Noel Grealish (Ind.)	Hildegarde Naughton (FG)	Mairéad Farrell (SF)	Éamon Ó Cuív (FF)	Catherine Connolly (Ind.)
34th	2024	Noel Grealish (Ind.)	Hildegarde Naughton (FG)	Mairéad Farrell (SF)	John Connolly (FF)	Catherine Connolly (Ind.)
34th	2026 by-election	Noel Grealish (Ind.)	Hildegarde Naughton (FG)	Mairéad Farrell (SF)	John Connolly (FF)	Seán Kyne (FG)
