= 1933 Irish general election =

Election to the 8th Dáil

- 24 January 1933

153 seats in Dáil Éireann (Note: Including Frank Fahy, returned automatically for the Galway as outgoing Ceann Comhairle, under Art. 21 of the Constitution, as amended by the Constitution (Amendment No. 2) Act 1927, and s. 2 of the Electoral (Amendment) Act 1927.) 77 seats needed for a majority
- Turnout: 81.3% ▲4.8 pp
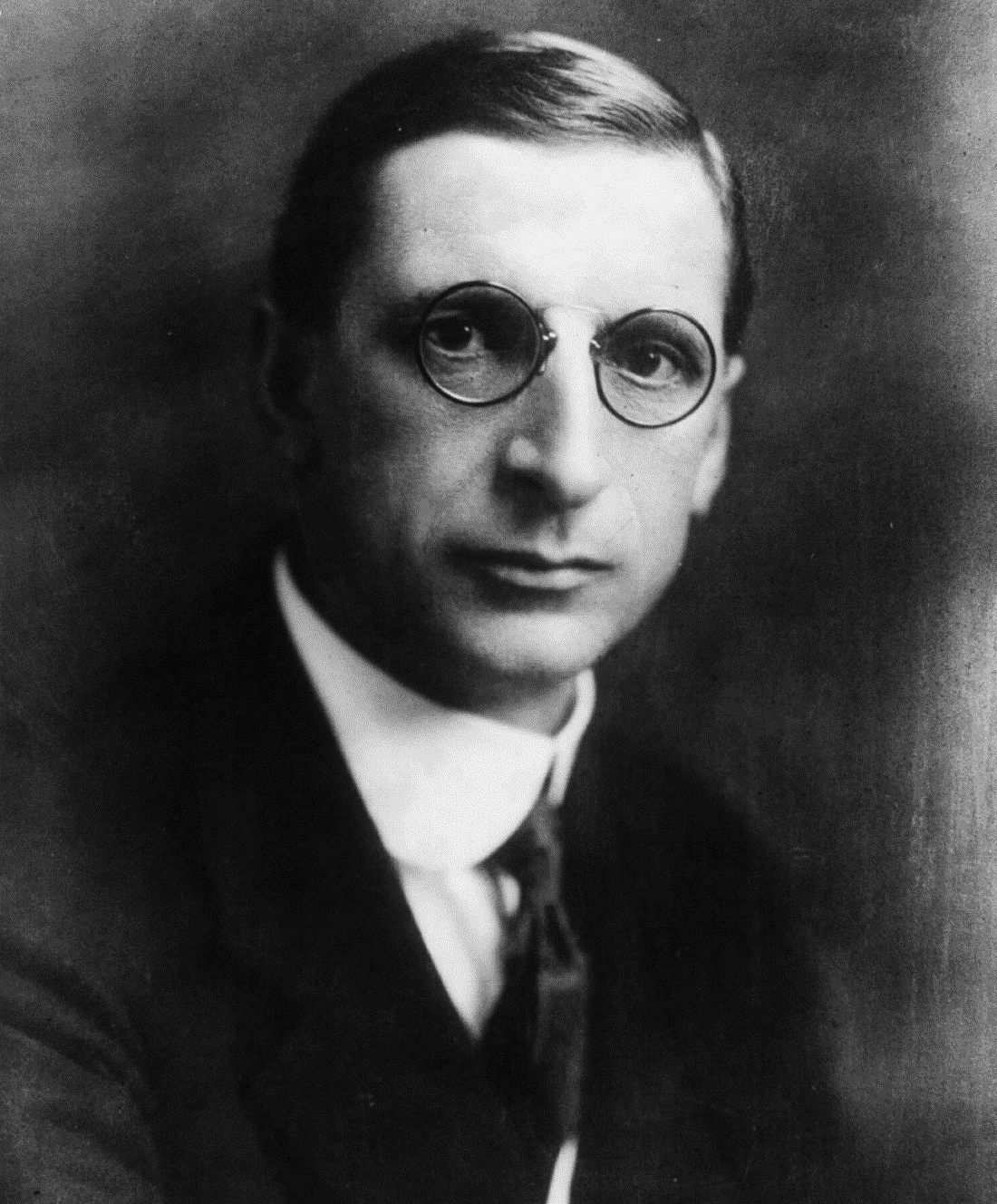

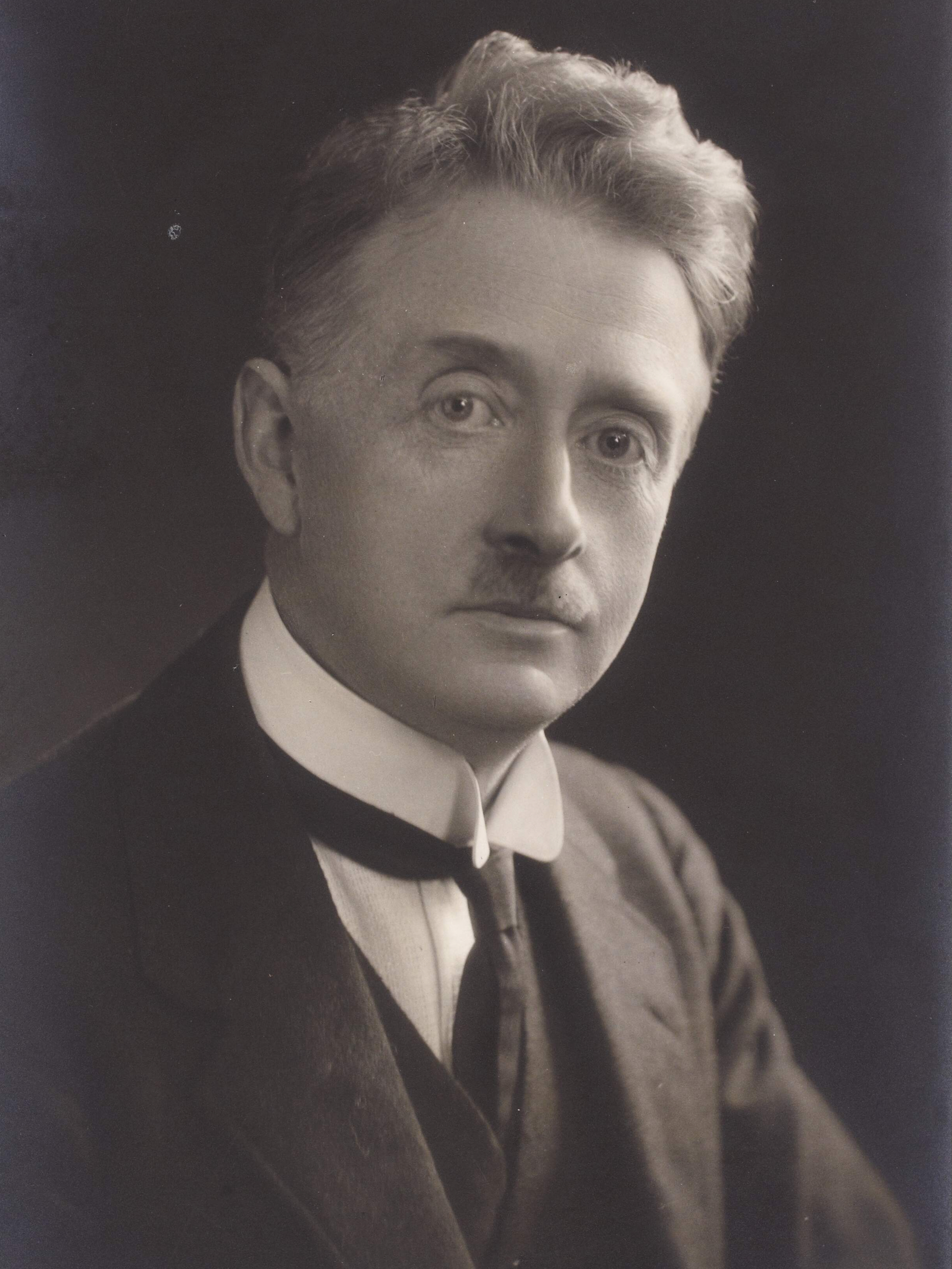

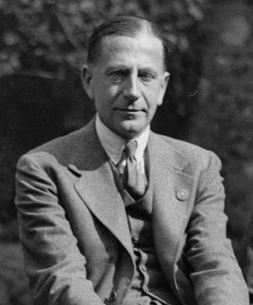

	First party	Second party
Leader	Éamon de Valera	W. T. Cosgrave
Party	Fianna Fáil	Cumann na nGaedheal
Leader since	26 March 1926	April 1923
Leader's seat	Clare	Cork Borough
Last election	72 seats, 44.5%	56 seats, 35.2%
Seats won	77 (Note: As Frank Fahy was re-elected Ceann Comhairle, Fianna Fáil effectively had 76 seats, one short of a majority)	48
Seat change	▲5	▼8
Popular vote	689,054	422,495
Percentage	49.7%	30.5%
Swing	▲5.2 pp	▼4.8 pp
	Third party	Fourth party
Leader	Frank MacDermot	William Norton
Party	National Centre Party	Labour
Leader since	1932	1932
Leader's seat	Roscommon	Kildare
Last election	N/A	7 seats, 7.7%
Seats won	11	8
Seat change	▲11	▲1
Popular vote	126,909	79,221
Percentage	9.2%	5.7%
Swing	New party	▼2.0 pp
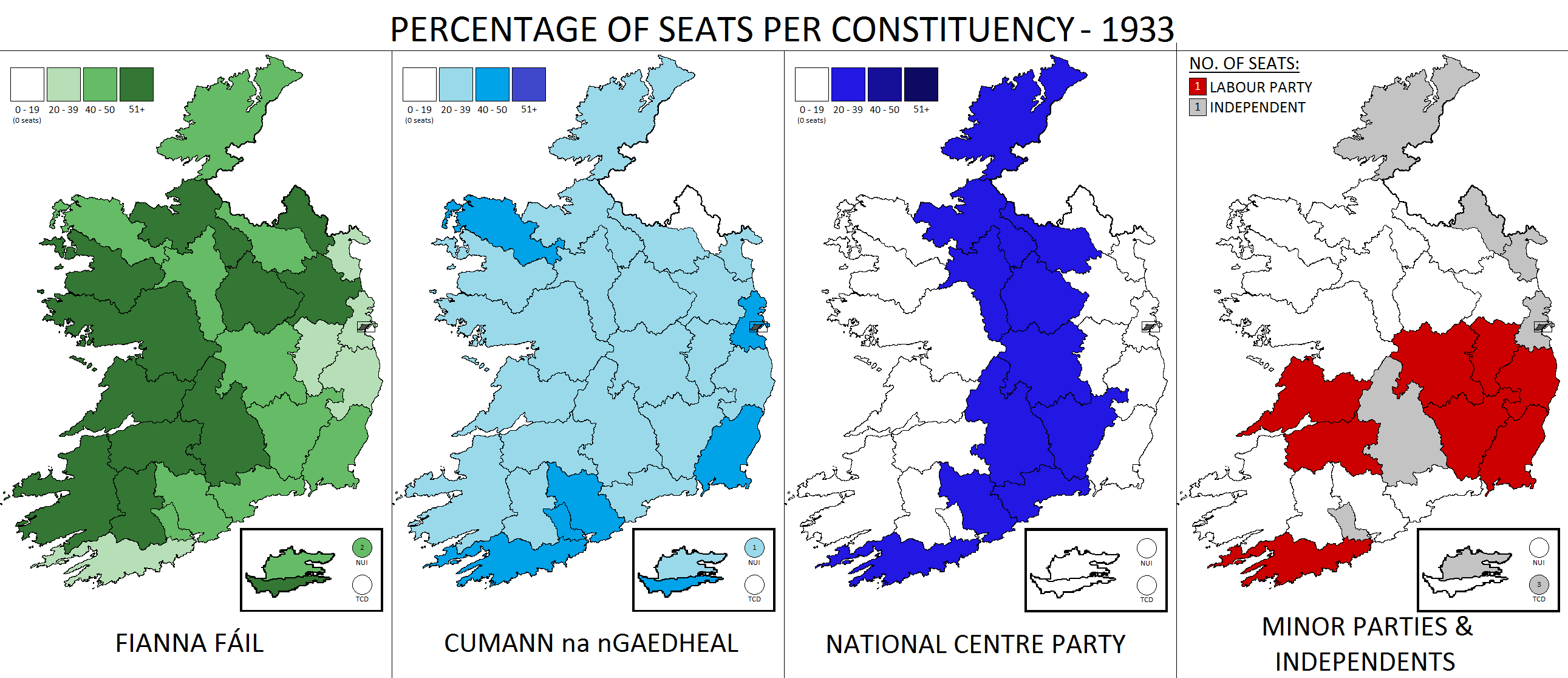
President of the Executive Council before election
Éamon de Valera
Fianna Fáil
President of the Executive Council after election
Éamon de Valera
Fianna Fáil

The 1933 Irish general election to the 8th Dáil was held on Tuesday, 24 January following the dissolution of the 7th Dáil on 2 January by Governor-General Domhnall Ua Buachalla on the advice of the Executive Council. The general election took place in 30 parliamentary constituencies throughout the Irish Free State for 153 seats in Dáil Éireann.

The 8th Dáil met at Leinster House on 8 February to nominate the President and Executive Council of the Irish Free State for appointment by the Governor-General. Outgoing president Éamon de Valera was re-appointed leading a Fianna Fáil government, which fell one seat short of an overall majority.

== Campaign ==
Newsreel footage of campaign
De Valera campaigning in Clare

Cosgrave campaigning in Dublin

== Result ==
Election to the 8th Dáil – 24 January 1933
Party	Leader	Seats	±	% of seats	First pref. votes	% FPv	±%
Fianna Fáil	Éamon de Valera	77	+5	50.3	689,054	49.7	+5.2
Cumann na nGaedheal	W. T. Cosgrave	48	–9	31.4	422,495	30.5	–4.8
National Centre Party	Frank MacDermot	11	New	7.2	126,909	9.2	–
Labour	William Norton	8	+1	5.2	79,221	5.7	–2.0
Independent	N/A	9	–5	5.9	68,882	5.0	–5.4
Spoilt votes					14,707	—N/a	—N/a
Total		153	0	100	1,401,265	100	—N/a
Electorate/Turnout					1,727,680	81.3	—N/a

=== Voting summary ===
First preference vote
Fianna Fáil	49.70%
Cumann na nGaedheal	30.47%
National Centre	9.15%
Labour	5.71%
Independent	4.97%

=== Seats summary ===
Dáil seats
Fianna Fáil	50.33%
Cumann na nGaedheal	31.37%
National Centre	7.19%
Labour	5.23%
Independent	5.88%

== Government formation ==
Excluding the Ceann Comhairle, Fianna Fáil won exactly half the seats and formed the 7th Executive Council of the Irish Free State with support from the Labour Party. Fianna Fáil eventually won enough by-elections to govern without Labour Party support.

== Changes in membership ==
=== First time TDs ===
- James Burke
- John A. Costello
- Patrick Daly
- Robert Davitt
- Hugh Doherty
- Eamon Donnelly
- Séamus Keely
- Patrick Kehoe
- James McGuire
- James Morrisroe
- Margaret Mary Pearse

=== Re-elected TDs ===
- Martin McDonogh
- Michael Óg McFadden
- Patrick O'Dowd

=== Outgoing TDs ===
- Eamonn Duggan (Retired)
- Margaret Collins-O'Driscoll (Defeated)
- Francis Gormley (Defeated)
- Patrick Gorry (Defeated)
- Raphael Keyes (Defeated)
- John Kiersey (Defeated)
- Joseph Mongan (Defeated)
- Fred McDonogh (Defeated)
- Eugene O'Brien (Defeated)
- Patrick O'Hara (Retired)
- Martin Sexton (Defeated)
