= 9th Dáil =

TDs from 1937 to 1938

←	8th Dáil	10th Dáil	→

Overview
- Legislative body: Dáil Éireann
- Jurisdiction: Irish Free State; Ireland
- Meeting place: Leinster House
- Term: 21 July 1937 – 27 May 1938
- Election: 1937 general election
- Government: 8th executive council (until 29 December 1937); 1st government of Ireland
- Members: 138
- Ceann Comhairle: Frank Fahy
- President of the Executive Council: Éamon de Valera until 29 December 1937
- Vice-President of the Executive Council: Seán T. O'Kelly until 29 December 1937
- Taoiseach: Éamon de Valera from 29 December 1937
- Tánaiste: Seán T. O'Kelly from 29 December 1937
- Chief Whip: Patrick Little
- Leader of the Opposition: W. T. Cosgrave

Sessions
- 1st: 21 July 1937 – 21 July 1937
- 2nd: 6 October 1937 – 25 May 1938

The 9th Dáil was elected at the 1937 general election on 1 July 1937 and met on 21 July 1937. The members of Dáil Éireann, the Chamber of Deputies of the Oireachtas (legislature) of the Irish Free State, are known as TDs. Seanad Éireann, a second chamber in the Irish Free State, had been abolished in May 1936.

On 29 December 1937, the Constitution of Ireland came into effect, with the state being renamed as Ireland. Under Article 54 of the Constitution, the Dáil established by the Constitution of the Irish Free State became Dáil Éireann of the new bicameral Oireachtas, being described in Article 15 of the Constitution as a House of Representatives. Under Article 55, the Oireachtas consisted of a single chamber only, pending the first assembly of the new Seanad Éireann on 27 April 1938. This took place following an indirect election forming the 2nd Seanad.

The 9th Dáil was dissolved on 27 May 1938 by the Presidential Commission, as constituted under Article 57 of the Constitution prior to the coming into office of the first president of Ireland. The 9th Dáil lasted 310 days. There were no by-elections during the 9th Dáil.

== Composition of the 9th Dáil ==
- 8th Executive Council, 3rd government
- Providing confidence and supply

Party	July 1937	May 1938	Change
Fianna Fáil	69	67	▼2
Fine Gael	48	48	Steady
Labour	13	13	Steady
Independent	8	8	Steady
Ceann Comhairle	—N/a	1	▲1
Vacant	—N/a	1	▲1
Total	138		

Fianna Fáil formed the 8th executive council of the Irish Free State, a minority government dependent on the support of the Labour Party. Under Article 56 of the Constitution, this became the 1st government of Ireland on the coming into operation of the Constitution on 29 December 1937.

=== Graphical representation ===
This is a graphical comparison of party strengths in the 9th Dáil from July 1937. This was not the official seating plan.

== Ceann Comhairle ==
On 21 July 1937, Frank Fahy (FF), who had served as Ceann Comhairle since 1932, was proposed by Éamon de Valera and seconded by William Norton for the position, and was elected without a vote.

== TDs by constituency ==
The 138 TDs elected at the 1937 general election is given by Dáil constituency.

Members of the 9th Dáil
Constituency	Name	Party
Athlone–Longford	Matthew Davis	Fianna Fáil
Athlone–Longford	Seán Mac Eoin	Fine Gael
Athlone–Longford	James Victory	Fianna Fáil
Carlow–Kildare	Thomas Harris	Fianna Fáil
Carlow–Kildare	Francis Humphreys	Fianna Fáil
Carlow–Kildare	Sydney Minch	Fine Gael
Carlow–Kildare	William Norton	Labour
Cavan	John James Cole	Independent
Cavan	Patrick McGovern	Fine Gael
Cavan	Michael Sheridan	Fianna Fáil
Cavan	Paddy Smith	Fianna Fáil
Clare	Patrick Burke	Fine Gael
Clare	Thomas Burke	Independent
Clare	Éamon de Valera	Fianna Fáil
Clare	Seán O'Grady	Fianna Fáil
Clare	Patrick Hogan	Labour
Cork Borough	Richard Anthony	Independent
Cork Borough	W. T. Cosgrave	Fine Gael
Cork Borough	Thomas Dowdall	Fianna Fáil
Cork Borough	Hugo Flinn	Fianna Fáil
Cork North	Patrick Daly	Fine Gael
Cork North	Timothy Linehan	Fine Gael
Cork North	Con Meaney	Fianna Fáil
Cork North	Seán Moylan	Fianna Fáil
Cork South-East	Brook Brasier	Fine Gael
Cork South-East	Martin Corry	Fianna Fáil
Cork South-East	Jeremiah Hurley	Labour
Cork West	Timothy J. Murphy	Labour
Cork West	Timothy O'Donovan	Fine Gael
Cork West	Daniel O'Leary	Fine Gael
Cork West	Eamonn O'Neill	Fine Gael
Cork West	Timothy O'Sullivan	Fianna Fáil
Donegal East	Neal Blaney	Fianna Fáil
Donegal East	John Friel	Fianna Fáil
Donegal East	Daniel McMenamin	Fine Gael
Donegal East	James Myles	Independent
Donegal West	Brian Brady	Fianna Fáil
Donegal West	Cormac Breslin	Fianna Fáil
Donegal West	Michael Óg McFadden	Fine Gael
Dublin South	Robert Briscoe	Fianna Fáil
Dublin South	Peadar Doyle	Fine Gael
Dublin South	Joseph Hannigan	Independent
Dublin South	Thomas Kelly	Fianna Fáil
Dublin South	Myles Keogh	Fine Gael
Dublin South	Thomas Lawlor	Labour
Dublin South	Seán Lemass	Fianna Fáil
Dublin County	Seán Brady	Fianna Fáil
Dublin County	Henry Dockrell	Fine Gael
Dublin County	Patrick Fogarty	Fianna Fáil
Dublin County	Cecil Lavery	Fine Gael
Dublin County	Gerrard McGowan	Labour
Dublin North-East	Alfie Byrne	Independent
Dublin North-East	James Larkin	Independent
Dublin North-East	Oscar Traynor	Fianna Fáil
Dublin North-West	Cormac Breathnach	Fianna Fáil
Dublin North-West	A. P. Byrne	Independent
Dublin North-West	Archie Heron	Labour
Dublin North-West	Patrick McGilligan	Fine Gael
Dublin North-West	Seán T. O'Kelly	Fianna Fáil
Dublin Townships	Ernest Benson	Fine Gael
Dublin Townships	John A. Costello	Fine Gael
Dublin Townships	Seán MacEntee	Fianna Fáil
Galway East	Patrick Beegan	Fianna Fáil
Galway East	Seán Broderick	Fine Gael
Galway East	Frank Fahy	Fianna Fáil
Galway East	Mark Killilea Snr	Fianna Fáil
Galway West	Gerald Bartley	Fianna Fáil
Galway West	Joseph Mongan	Fine Gael
Galway West	Seán Tubridy	Fianna Fáil
Kerry North	Stephen Fuller	Fianna Fáil
Kerry North	Eamon Kissane	Fianna Fáil
Kerry North	Tom McEllistrim	Fianna Fáil
Kerry North	John M. O'Sullivan	Fine Gael
Kerry South	Frederick Crowley	Fianna Fáil
Kerry South	John Flynn	Fianna Fáil
Kerry South	Fionán Lynch	Fine Gael
Kilkenny	Denis Gorey	Fine Gael
Kilkenny	Thomas Derrig	Fianna Fáil
Kilkenny	James Pattison	Labour
Leitrim	Stephen Flynn	Fianna Fáil
Leitrim	Bernard Maguire	Fianna Fáil
Leitrim	Mary Reynolds	Fine Gael
Leix–Offaly	Patrick Boland	Fianna Fáil
Leix–Offaly	William Davin	Labour
Leix–Offaly	Jack Finlay	Fine Gael
Leix–Offaly	Patrick Gorry	Fianna Fáil
Leix–Offaly	Thomas F. O'Higgins	Fine Gael
Limerick	Daniel Bourke	Fianna Fáil
Limerick	George C. Bennett	Fine Gael
Limerick	Michael Colbert	Fianna Fáil
Limerick	Michael Keyes	Labour
Limerick	Donnchadh Ó Briain	Fianna Fáil
Limerick	John O'Shaughnessy	Fine Gael
Limerick	Robert Ryan	Fianna Fáil
Louth	Frank Aiken	Fianna Fáil
Louth	James Coburn	Fine Gael
Louth	Laurence Walsh	Fianna Fáil
Mayo North	Patrick Browne	Fine Gael
Mayo North	John Munnelly	Fianna Fáil
Mayo North	P. J. Ruttledge	Fianna Fáil
Mayo South	Micheál Clery	Fianna Fáil
Mayo South	James FitzGerald-Kenney	Fine Gael
Mayo South	Edward Moane	Fianna Fáil
Mayo South	Martin Nally	Fine Gael
Mayo South	Richard Walsh	Fianna Fáil
Meath–Westmeath	Charles Fagan	Fine Gael
Meath–Westmeath	Patrick Giles	Fine Gael
Meath–Westmeath	James Kelly	Fianna Fáil
Meath–Westmeath	Michael Kennedy	Fianna Fáil
Meath–Westmeath	Matthew O'Reilly	Fianna Fáil
Monaghan	James Dillon	Fine Gael
Monaghan	Eamon Rice	Fianna Fáil
Monaghan	Conn Ward	Fianna Fáil
Roscommon	Gerald Boland	Fianna Fáil
Roscommon	Michael Brennan	Fine Gael
Roscommon	Daniel O'Rourke	Fianna Fáil
Sligo	Frank Carty	Fianna Fáil
Sligo	Martin Roddy	Fine Gael
Sligo	Patrick Rogers	Fine Gael
Tipperary	Dan Breen	Fianna Fáil
Tipperary	Séamus Burke	Fine Gael
Tipperary	Andrew Fogarty	Fianna Fáil
Tipperary	Daniel Morrissey	Fine Gael
Tipperary	William O'Brien	Labour
Tipperary	Martin Ryan	Fianna Fáil
Tipperary	Jeremiah Ryan	Fine Gael
Waterford	Patrick Little	Fianna Fáil
Waterford	Michael Morrissey	Fianna Fáil
Waterford	Bridget Redmond	Fine Gael
Waterford	Nicholas Wall	Fine Gael
Wexford	Denis Allen	Fianna Fáil
Wexford	Richard Corish	Labour
Wexford	John Esmonde	Fine Gael
Wexford	John Keating	Fine Gael
Wexford	James Ryan	Fianna Fáil
Wicklow	James Everett	Labour
Wicklow	Séamus Moore	Fianna Fáil
Wicklow	Dermot O'Mahony	Fine Gael

== Changes ==
Date	Constituency	Loss	Gain	Note
21 July 1937	Galway East	Fianna Fáil	Ceann Comhairle	Frank Fahy takes office as Ceann Comhairle
7 November 1937	Cork West	Fianna Fáil		Death of Eamon Rice
