= George Clancy (politician) =

Irish politician

- Seoirse Mac Fhlannchadha

Mayor of Limerick
- In office January 1921 – 7 March 1921

Personal details
- Born: 18 March 1881 Grange, County Limerick, Ireland
- Died: 7 March 1921 (aged 39) Limerick, Ireland
- Party: Sinn Féin
- Relations: Patrick Clancy (brother)
- Education: University College Dublin

Military service
- Branch/service: Irish Volunteers
- Battles/wars: 1916 Easter Rising

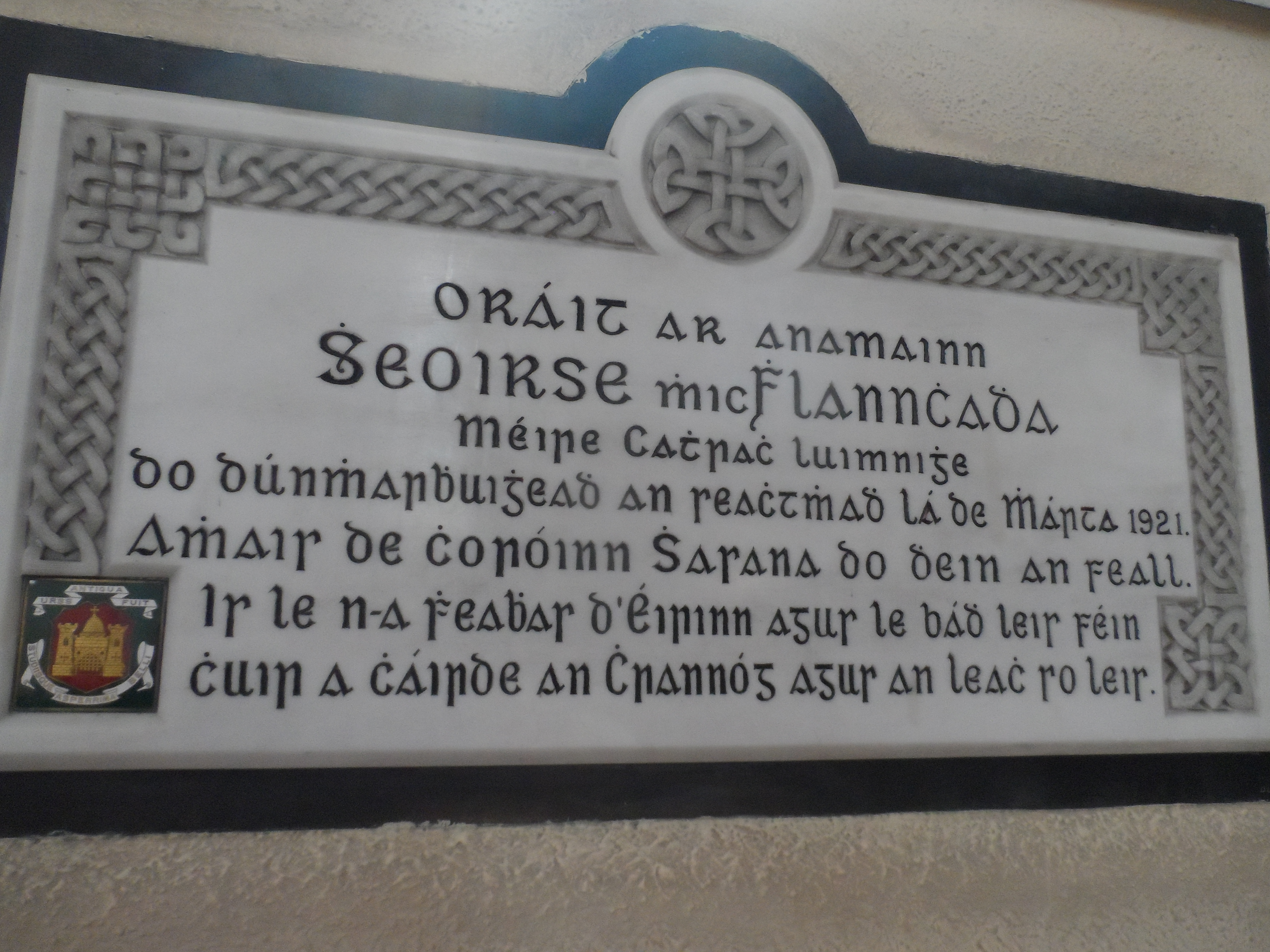
George Clancy memorial plaque in St Munchin's Catholic church, Limerick

George Clancy (Irish: Seoirse Mac Fhlannchadha; 18 March 1881 – 7 March 1921), was an Irish nationalist politician and Mayor of Limerick. He was shot dead in Limerick by Royal Irish Constabulary Auxiliaries in 1921 during the Irish War of Independence. The previous Mayor, Michael O'Callaghan, was assassinated on the same night by the same group.

== Life ==
Clancy was born at Grange, County Limerick. He was educated at Crescent College, Limerick, and thereafter at the Catholic University in St Stephen's Green, now University College Dublin. Among his friends at the university were James Joyce, Francis Sheehy-Skeffington and Tom Kettle. He helped form a branch of the Gaelic League at college and persuaded his friends, including Joyce, to take lessons in Irish. He played hurling and was a good friend of Michael Cusack. With Arthur Griffin he joined the Celtic Literary Society.

He graduated in 1904 and found a teaching position at Clongowes Wood College. Due to ill health he had to return to his home at Grange. In 1908 he came to Limerick City to teach Irish. In 1913 he joined the Irish Volunteers. In 1915 he married Máire Killeen, a teacher. After the 1916 Easter Rising he was arrested and imprisoned in Cork, but after a hunger strike was released before he came to trial.

He was elected Sinn Féin Mayor of Limerick in 1921. On the night of 6 March 1921 three Auxiliaries from the Royal Irish Constabulary (RIC) came to his house and one of them shot him, injuring him fatally. His wife was injured in the attack. One of his killers was later said to be George Nathan who died fighting for the Republicans in the Spanish Civil War.

He features as the character Michael Davin, in Joyce's A Portrait of the Artist as a Young Man.

Clancy Strand, a riverside street in Limerick, was named after him.

His brother Patrick Clancy was a Labour Party Teachta Dála (TD) for Limerick from 1923 to 1932.

Civic offices
Preceded by Michael O'Callaghan	Mayor of Limerick; 1921	Succeeded by Stephen M. O'Mara
