= Patrick Hogan (Farmers' Party politician) =

Irish politician

Teachta Dála
- In office August 1923 – June 1927
- Constituency: Limerick

Personal details
- Party: Farmers' Party

Patrick K. Hogan was an Irish Farmers' Party politician and farmer. At the 1923 general election he was elected as a Teachta Dála (TD) for the Limerick constituency, one of fifteen Farmers' Party TDs elected that year. He did not stand at the June 1927 general election.

| Dáil | Election | Deputy (Party) | Deputy (Party) | Deputy (Party) | Deputy (Party) | Deputy (Party) | Deputy (Party) | Deputy (Party) |
|---|---|---|---|---|---|---|---|---|
| 4th | 1923 | Richard Hayes (CnaG) | James Ledden (CnaG) | Seán Carroll (Rep) | James Colbert (Rep) | John Nolan (CnaG) | Patrick Clancy (Lab) | Patrick Hogan (FP) |
| 4th | 1924 by-election | Richard O'Connell (CnaG) | James Ledden (CnaG) | Seán Carroll (Rep) | James Colbert (Rep) | John Nolan (CnaG) | Patrick Clancy (Lab) | Patrick Hogan (FP) |
| 5th | 1927 (Jun) | Richard O'Connell (CnaG) | Gilbert Hewson (Ind.) | Tadhg Crowley (FF) | James Colbert (FF) | George C. Bennett (CnaG) | Patrick Clancy (Lab) | Michael Keyes (Lab) |
| 6th | 1927 (Sep) | Richard O'Connell (CnaG) | Daniel Bourke (FF) | Tadhg Crowley (FF) | James Colbert (FF) | George C. Bennett (CnaG) | Patrick Clancy (Lab) | John Nolan (CnaG) |
| 7th | 1932 | James Reidy (CnaG) | Daniel Bourke (FF) | Tadhg Crowley (FF) | James Colbert (FF) | George C. Bennett (CnaG) | Robert Ryan (FF) | John O'Shaughnessy (FP) |
| 8th | 1933 | James Reidy (CnaG) | Daniel Bourke (FF) | Tadhg Crowley (FF) | Donnchadh Ó Briain (FF) | George C. Bennett (CnaG) | Robert Ryan (FF) | Michael Keyes (Lab) |
| 9th | 1937 | John O'Shaughnessy (FG) | Daniel Bourke (FF) | Michael Colbert (FF) | Donnchadh Ó Briain (FF) | George C. Bennett (FG) | Robert Ryan (FF) | Michael Keyes (Lab) |
| 10th | 1938 | James Reidy (FG) | Daniel Bourke (FF) | Tadhg Crowley (FF) | Donnchadh Ó Briain (FF) | George C. Bennett (FG) | Robert Ryan (FF) | Michael Keyes (Lab) |
| 11th | 1943 | James Reidy (FG) | Daniel Bourke (FF) | Tadhg Crowley (FF) | Donnchadh Ó Briain (FF) | George C. Bennett (FG) | Robert Ryan (FF) | Michael Keyes (Lab) |
| 12th | 1944 | James Reidy (FG) | Daniel Bourke (FF) | Michael Colbert (FF) | Donnchadh Ó Briain (FF) | George C. Bennett (FG) | Robert Ryan (FF) | Michael Keyes (Lab) |
| 13th | 1948 | Constituency abolished. See Limerick East and Limerick West | | | | | | |

| Dáil | Election | Deputy (Party) | Deputy (Party) | Deputy (Party) |
|---|---|---|---|---|
| 31st | 2011 | Niall Collins (FF) | Dan Neville (FG) | Patrick O'Donovan (FG) |
| 32nd | 2016 | Constituency abolished. See Limerick County | | |
