= James Ledden =

Irish politician (died 1927)

- Ledden in 1915

Teachta Dála
- In office August 1923 – 19 January 1927
- Constituency: Limerick

Personal details
- Died: 19 January 1927
- Party: Cumann na nGaedheal

James Ledden (died 19 January 1927) was an Irish Cumann na nGaedheal politician. He was elected to Dáil Éireann as a Cumann na nGaedheal Teachta Dála (TD) for the Limerick constituency at the 1923 general election, and died in office. No by-election was held for his seat.

Dáil	Election	Deputy (Party)	Deputy (Party)	Deputy (Party)	Deputy (Party)	Deputy (Party)	Deputy (Party)	Deputy (Party)
4th	1923	Richard Hayes (CnaG)	James Ledden (CnaG)	Seán Carroll (Rep)	James Colbert (Rep)	John Nolan (CnaG)	Patrick Clancy (Lab)	Patrick Hogan (FP)
4th	1924 by-election	Richard O'Connell (CnaG)	James Ledden (CnaG)	Seán Carroll (Rep)	James Colbert (Rep)	John Nolan (CnaG)	Patrick Clancy (Lab)	Patrick Hogan (FP)
5th	1927 (Jun)	Richard O'Connell (CnaG)	Gilbert Hewson (Ind.)	Tadhg Crowley (FF)	James Colbert (FF)	George C. Bennett (CnaG)	Patrick Clancy (Lab)	Michael Keyes (Lab)
6th	1927 (Sep)	Richard O'Connell (CnaG)	Daniel Bourke (FF)	Tadhg Crowley (FF)	James Colbert (FF)	George C. Bennett (CnaG)	Patrick Clancy (Lab)	John Nolan (CnaG)
7th	1932	James Reidy (CnaG)	Daniel Bourke (FF)	Tadhg Crowley (FF)	James Colbert (FF)	George C. Bennett (CnaG)	Robert Ryan (FF)	John O'Shaughnessy (FP)
8th	1933	James Reidy (CnaG)	Daniel Bourke (FF)	Tadhg Crowley (FF)	Donnchadh Ó Briain (FF)	George C. Bennett (CnaG)	Robert Ryan (FF)	Michael Keyes (Lab)
9th	1937	John O'Shaughnessy (FG)	Daniel Bourke (FF)	Michael Colbert (FF)	Donnchadh Ó Briain (FF)	George C. Bennett (FG)	Robert Ryan (FF)	Michael Keyes (Lab)
10th	1938	James Reidy (FG)	Daniel Bourke (FF)	Tadhg Crowley (FF)	Donnchadh Ó Briain (FF)	George C. Bennett (FG)	Robert Ryan (FF)	Michael Keyes (Lab)
11th	1943	James Reidy (FG)	Daniel Bourke (FF)	Tadhg Crowley (FF)	Donnchadh Ó Briain (FF)	George C. Bennett (FG)	Robert Ryan (FF)	Michael Keyes (Lab)
12th	1944	James Reidy (FG)	Daniel Bourke (FF)	Michael Colbert (FF)	Donnchadh Ó Briain (FF)	George C. Bennett (FG)	Robert Ryan (FF)	Michael Keyes (Lab)
13th	1948	Constituency abolished. See Limerick East and Limerick West						

Dáil	Election	Deputy (Party)	Deputy (Party)	Deputy (Party)
31st	2011	Niall Collins (FF)	Dan Neville (FG)	Patrick O'Donovan (FG)
32nd	2016	Constituency abolished. See Limerick County		
