= James Reidy =

Irish politician (1890–1963)

- Reidy in 1921

Senator
- In office 22 July 1954 – 22 May 1957
- Constituency: Nominated by the Taoiseach

Teachta Dála
- In office February 1948 – May 1954
- Constituency: Limerick East
- In office June 1938 – February 1948
- In office February 1932 – July 1937
- Constituency: Limerick

Personal details
- Born: 1890 County Limerick, Ireland
- Died: 28 November 1963 (aged 72–73)
- Party: Cumann na nGaedheal (1932–1933); Fine Gael (1933–late 1950s)

James Reidy (1890 – 28 November 1963) was an Irish politician. He was elected to Dáil Éireann as a Cumann na nGaedheal Teachta Dála (TD) for the Limerick constituency at the 1932 general election. He was re-elected at the 1933 general election but lost his seat at the 1937 general election.

At the 1938 general election, he was elected as a Fine Gael TD. He was re-elected at each subsequent general election until he lost his seat at the 1954 general election. He was nominated by the Taoiseach to the 8th Seanad in 1954.

Dáil	Election	Deputy (Party)	Deputy (Party)	Deputy (Party)	Deputy (Party)	Deputy (Party)	Deputy (Party)	Deputy (Party)
4th	1923	Richard Hayes (CnaG)	James Ledden (CnaG)	Seán Carroll (Rep)	James Colbert (Rep)	John Nolan (CnaG)	Patrick Clancy (Lab)	Patrick Hogan (FP)
4th	1924 by-election	Richard O'Connell (CnaG)	James Ledden (CnaG)	Seán Carroll (Rep)	James Colbert (Rep)	John Nolan (CnaG)	Patrick Clancy (Lab)	Patrick Hogan (FP)
5th	1927 (Jun)	Richard O'Connell (CnaG)	Gilbert Hewson (Ind.)	Tadhg Crowley (FF)	James Colbert (FF)	George C. Bennett (CnaG)	Patrick Clancy (Lab)	Michael Keyes (Lab)
6th	1927 (Sep)	Richard O'Connell (CnaG)	Daniel Bourke (FF)	Tadhg Crowley (FF)	James Colbert (FF)	George C. Bennett (CnaG)	Patrick Clancy (Lab)	John Nolan (CnaG)
7th	1932	James Reidy (CnaG)	Daniel Bourke (FF)	Tadhg Crowley (FF)	James Colbert (FF)	George C. Bennett (CnaG)	Robert Ryan (FF)	John O'Shaughnessy (FP)
8th	1933	James Reidy (CnaG)	Daniel Bourke (FF)	Tadhg Crowley (FF)	Donnchadh Ó Briain (FF)	George C. Bennett (CnaG)	Robert Ryan (FF)	Michael Keyes (Lab)
9th	1937	John O'Shaughnessy (FG)	Daniel Bourke (FF)	Michael Colbert (FF)	Donnchadh Ó Briain (FF)	George C. Bennett (FG)	Robert Ryan (FF)	Michael Keyes (Lab)
10th	1938	James Reidy (FG)	Daniel Bourke (FF)	Tadhg Crowley (FF)	Donnchadh Ó Briain (FF)	George C. Bennett (FG)	Robert Ryan (FF)	Michael Keyes (Lab)
11th	1943	James Reidy (FG)	Daniel Bourke (FF)	Tadhg Crowley (FF)	Donnchadh Ó Briain (FF)	George C. Bennett (FG)	Robert Ryan (FF)	Michael Keyes (Lab)
12th	1944	James Reidy (FG)	Daniel Bourke (FF)	Michael Colbert (FF)	Donnchadh Ó Briain (FF)	George C. Bennett (FG)	Robert Ryan (FF)	Michael Keyes (Lab)
13th	1948	Constituency abolished. See Limerick East and Limerick West						

Dáil	Election	Deputy (Party)	Deputy (Party)	Deputy (Party)
31st	2011	Niall Collins (FF)	Dan Neville (FG)	Patrick O'Donovan (FG)
32nd	2016	Constituency abolished. See Limerick County		

Dáil	Election	Deputy (Party)	Deputy (Party)	Deputy (Party)	Deputy (Party)	Deputy (Party)
13th	1948	Michael Keyes (Lab)	Robert Ryan (FF)	James Reidy (FG)	Daniel Bourke (FF)	4 seats 1948–1981
14th	1951	Michael Keyes (Lab)	Tadhg Crowley (FF)	James Reidy (FG)	Daniel Bourke (FF)	4 seats 1948–1981
14th	1952 by-election	Michael Keyes (Lab)	Tadhg Crowley (FF)	James Reidy (FG)	John Carew (FG)	4 seats 1948–1981
15th	1954	Michael Keyes (Lab)	Tadhg Crowley (FF)	Donogh O'Malley (FF)	John Carew (FG)	4 seats 1948–1981
16th	1957	Ted Russell (Ind.)	Paddy Clohessy (FF)	Donogh O'Malley (FF)	John Carew (FG)	4 seats 1948–1981
17th	1961	Stephen Coughlan (Lab)	Paddy Clohessy (FF)	Donogh O'Malley (FF)	Tom O'Donnell (FG)	4 seats 1948–1981
18th	1965	Stephen Coughlan (Lab)	Paddy Clohessy (FF)	Donogh O'Malley (FF)	Tom O'Donnell (FG)	4 seats 1948–1981
18th	1968 by-election	Stephen Coughlan (Lab)	Paddy Clohessy (FF)	Desmond O'Malley (FF)	Tom O'Donnell (FG)	4 seats 1948–1981
19th	1969	Stephen Coughlan (Lab)	Michael Herbert (FF)	Desmond O'Malley (FF)	Tom O'Donnell (FG)	4 seats 1948–1981
20th	1973	Stephen Coughlan (Lab)	Michael Herbert (FF)	Desmond O'Malley (FF)	Tom O'Donnell (FG)	4 seats 1948–1981
21st	1977	Michael Lipper (Ind.)	Michael Herbert (FF)	Desmond O'Malley (FF)	Tom O'Donnell (FG)	4 seats 1948–1981
22nd	1981	Jim Kemmy (Ind.)	Peadar Clohessy (FF)	Desmond O'Malley (FF)	Tom O'Donnell (FG)	Michael Noonan (FG)
23rd	1982 (Feb)	Jim Kemmy (DSP)	Willie O'Dea (FF)	Desmond O'Malley (FF)	Tom O'Donnell (FG)	Michael Noonan (FG)
24th	1982 (Nov)	Frank Prendergast (Lab)	Willie O'Dea (FF)	Desmond O'Malley (FF)	Tom O'Donnell (FG)	Michael Noonan (FG)
25th	1987	Jim Kemmy (DSP)	Willie O'Dea (FF)	Desmond O'Malley (PDs)	Peadar Clohessy (PDs)	Michael Noonan (FG)
26th	1989	Jim Kemmy (DSP)	Willie O'Dea (FF)	Desmond O'Malley (PDs)	Peadar Clohessy (PDs)	Michael Noonan (FG)
27th	1992	Jim Kemmy (Lab)	Willie O'Dea (FF)	Desmond O'Malley (PDs)	Peadar Clohessy (PDs)	Michael Noonan (FG)
28th	1997	Jim Kemmy (Lab)	Willie O'Dea (FF)	Desmond O'Malley (PDs)	Eddie Wade (FF)	Michael Noonan (FG)
28th	1998 by-election	Jan O'Sullivan (Lab)	Willie O'Dea (FF)	Desmond O'Malley (PDs)	Eddie Wade (FF)	Michael Noonan (FG)
29th	2002	Jan O'Sullivan (Lab)	Willie O'Dea (FF)	Tim O'Malley (PDs)	Peter Power (FF)	Michael Noonan (FG)
30th	2007	Jan O'Sullivan (Lab)	Willie O'Dea (FF)	Kieran O'Donnell (FG)	Peter Power (FF)	Michael Noonan (FG)
31st	2011	Constituency abolished. See Limerick City and Limerick				
