= 1924 Limerick by-election =

By-election to the 4th Dáil

- 28 May 1924
- Turnout: 51,981 (65.8%)
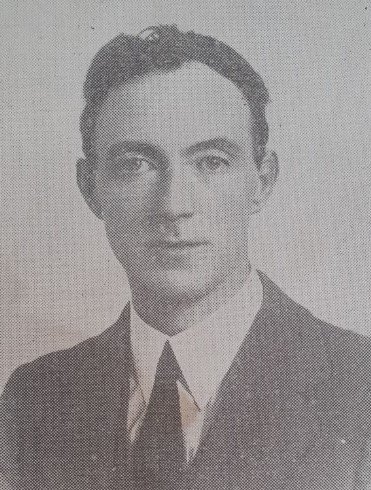
	O'Connell
Nominee	Richard O'Connell	Tadhg Crowley
Party	Cumann na nGaedheal	Republican
First preferences	28,243	23,738
Percentage	54.3%	45.7%
TD before election
Richard Hayes
Cumann na nGaedheal
TD after election
Richard O'Connell
Cumann na nGaedheal

A Dáil by-election was held in the constituency of Limerick in the Irish Free State on Wednesday, 28 May 1924, to fill a vacancy in the 4th Dáil. Limerick was a seven seat constituency comprising the administrative county of County Limerick and the county borough of Limerick.

Richard Hayes, Teachta Dála (TD) for Cumann na nGaedheal, resigned on 10 January 1924. Hayes had been a TD since the 1918 general election.

A government motion to issue the writ was agreed on 9 May 1924.

== Result ==
The by-election was held on 28 May 1924. The seat was won by Richard O'Connell.

1924 Limerick by-election
Party	Candidate	FPv%	Count
Party	Candidate	FPv%	1
Cumann na nGaedheal	Richard O'Connell	54.3	28,243
Republican	Tadhg Crowley	45.7	23,738
Electorate: 79,000 Valid: 51,981 Quota: 25,991 Turnout: 65.8%

O'Connell took his seat in Dáil Éireann on 11 June, after taking the Oath of Allegiance required under Article 17 of the Constitution of the Irish Free State.
