= James Colbert =

Irish politician (1890–1970)

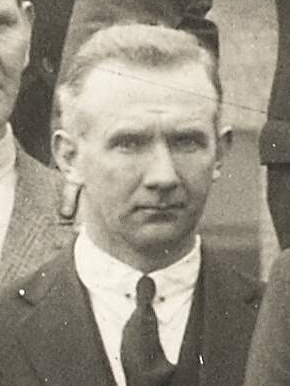
- Colbert in 1927

Teachta Dála
- In office August 1923 – January 1933
- Constituency: Limerick

Personal details
- Born: 3 January 1890 Castlemahon, County Limerick, Ireland
- Died: 28 February 1970 (aged 80) Dublin, Ireland
- Party: Fianna Fáil
- Other political affiliations: Sinn Féin
- Relatives: Con Colbert (brother); Michael Colbert (cousin)

James Colbert (3 January 1890 – 28 January 1970) was an Irish revolutionary, politician and farmer.

== Early life ==
Born in the townland of Moanleana, Castlemahon, County Limerick, he was the son of Michael Colbert, a farmer, and Honora McDermott. An older brother Con Colbert, was executed for his part in the 1916 Easter Rising.

His family later moved to the village of Athea. In 1901, his family were living in the townland of Templeathea West.

== Political activity ==
During the Irish War of Independence, Colbert served as Brigade Quartermaster of West Limerick Brigade, Irish Republican Army (IRA) and took part in ambushes and operations against British forces while attached to IRA 'Flying Column' (Active Service Unit).

Taking the anti-Treaty side in the Irish Civil War, Colbert took part in engagements against National forces in County Limerick and County Kerry. He was arrested in September 1922 but escaped from Tintown, the Curragh, County Kildare on 23 April 1923 and remained 'on the run' until 1924. Colbert was later awarded a pension by the Irish government under the Military Service Pensions Act, 1934 for his service with Irish Volunteers and the IRA between 1917 and 1923.

He was first elected to Dáil Éireann as a Sinn Féin Teachta Dála (TD) for the Limerick constituency at the 1923 general election. He did not take his seat in the 4th Dáil due to Sinn Féin's abstentionist policy. He was elected as a Fianna Fáil TD at the June 1927 general election. He was re-elected at the September 1927 and 1932 general elections. He lost his seat at the 1933 general election.

== Death ==
Colbert, who was a resident of Bray, County Wicklow, died on 28 January 1970 in Dublin. He was buried in Glasnevin Cemetery.

James Colbert and Michael Colbert, who both represented Fianna Fáil for Limerick at different times, were cousins.

Dáil	Election	Deputy (Party)	Deputy (Party)	Deputy (Party)	Deputy (Party)	Deputy (Party)	Deputy (Party)	Deputy (Party)
4th	1923	Richard Hayes (CnaG)	James Ledden (CnaG)	Seán Carroll (Rep)	James Colbert (Rep)	John Nolan (CnaG)	Patrick Clancy (Lab)	Patrick Hogan (FP)
4th	1924 by-election	Richard O'Connell (CnaG)	James Ledden (CnaG)	Seán Carroll (Rep)	James Colbert (Rep)	John Nolan (CnaG)	Patrick Clancy (Lab)	Patrick Hogan (FP)
5th	1927 (Jun)	Richard O'Connell (CnaG)	Gilbert Hewson (Ind.)	Tadhg Crowley (FF)	James Colbert (FF)	George C. Bennett (CnaG)	Patrick Clancy (Lab)	Michael Keyes (Lab)
6th	1927 (Sep)	Richard O'Connell (CnaG)	Daniel Bourke (FF)	Tadhg Crowley (FF)	James Colbert (FF)	George C. Bennett (CnaG)	Patrick Clancy (Lab)	John Nolan (CnaG)
7th	1932	James Reidy (CnaG)	Daniel Bourke (FF)	Tadhg Crowley (FF)	James Colbert (FF)	George C. Bennett (CnaG)	Robert Ryan (FF)	John O'Shaughnessy (FP)
8th	1933	James Reidy (CnaG)	Daniel Bourke (FF)	Tadhg Crowley (FF)	Donnchadh Ó Briain (FF)	George C. Bennett (CnaG)	Robert Ryan (FF)	Michael Keyes (Lab)
9th	1937	John O'Shaughnessy (FG)	Daniel Bourke (FF)	Michael Colbert (FF)	Donnchadh Ó Briain (FF)	George C. Bennett (FG)	Robert Ryan (FF)	Michael Keyes (Lab)
10th	1938	James Reidy (FG)	Daniel Bourke (FF)	Tadhg Crowley (FF)	Donnchadh Ó Briain (FF)	George C. Bennett (FG)	Robert Ryan (FF)	Michael Keyes (Lab)
11th	1943	James Reidy (FG)	Daniel Bourke (FF)	Tadhg Crowley (FF)	Donnchadh Ó Briain (FF)	George C. Bennett (FG)	Robert Ryan (FF)	Michael Keyes (Lab)
12th	1944	James Reidy (FG)	Daniel Bourke (FF)	Michael Colbert (FF)	Donnchadh Ó Briain (FF)	George C. Bennett (FG)	Robert Ryan (FF)	Michael Keyes (Lab)
13th	1948	Constituency abolished. See Limerick East and Limerick West						

Dáil	Election	Deputy (Party)	Deputy (Party)	Deputy (Party)
31st	2011	Niall Collins (FF)	Dan Neville (FG)	Patrick O'Donovan (FG)
32nd	2016	Constituency abolished. See Limerick County		
