= Con Colbert =

Irish rebel and pioneer of Fianna Éireann (1888–1916)

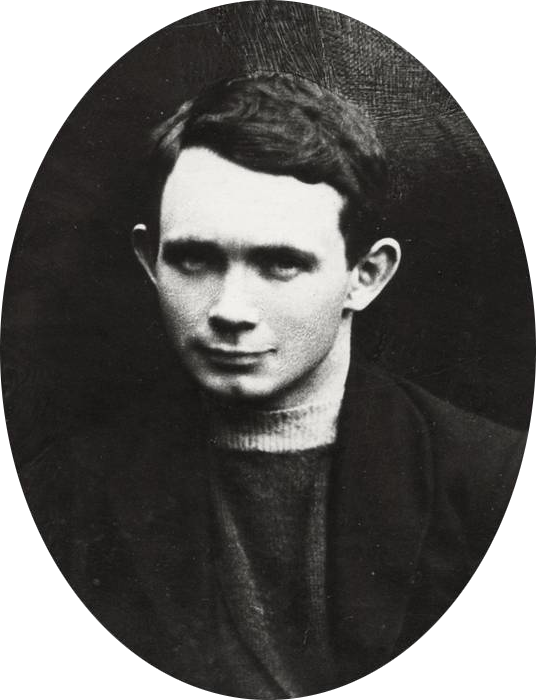
- Born: 19 October 1888; Castlemahon, Newcastle West, County Limerick, Ireland
- Died: 8 May 1916 (aged 27); Kilmainham Gaol, Dublin, Ireland
- Cause of death: Execution by firing squad
- Relatives: James Colbert (brother); Michael Colbert (cousin)
- Military career
- Allegiance: Irish Republic
- Branch: Irish Volunteers
- Service years: 1913–1916
- Rank: Captain
- Commands: F Company, 4th Battalion, Dublin Brigade
- Conflicts: Easter Rising
- Memorials: Limerick Colbert railway station

Cornelius Bernard Colbert (Irish: Conchúir Ó Colbáird; 19 October 1888 – 8 May 1916) was an Irish rebel and pioneer of Fianna Éireann. For his part in the Easter Rising of 1916, he was shot by firing squad in Kilmainham Gaol, Dublin, on 8 May 1916.

== Early life ==
Born in the townland of Moanleana, Castlemahon, County Limerick, he was the fourth youngest of thirteen children of Michael Colbert, a farmer, and Honora McDermott.

His family moved to the village of Athea when Con was three years old. He was educated at the local national school. In 1901, his family were living in the townland of Templeathea West. A younger brother, James, and a cousin, Michael Colbert, would later serve as TDs.

He left Athea at the age of 16 and went to live with his sister Catherine in Ranelagh, County Dublin. Colbert continued his education at a Christian Brothers school in North Richmond street. He was employed as a clerk in the offices of Kennedy's Bakery in Dublin. In 1911, he was living with Catherine, two other siblings and two boarders at a house on Clifton Terrace, Rathmines.

Colbert was a deeply religious Catholic and refrained from smoking or drinking.

== Fianna and Volunteers ==
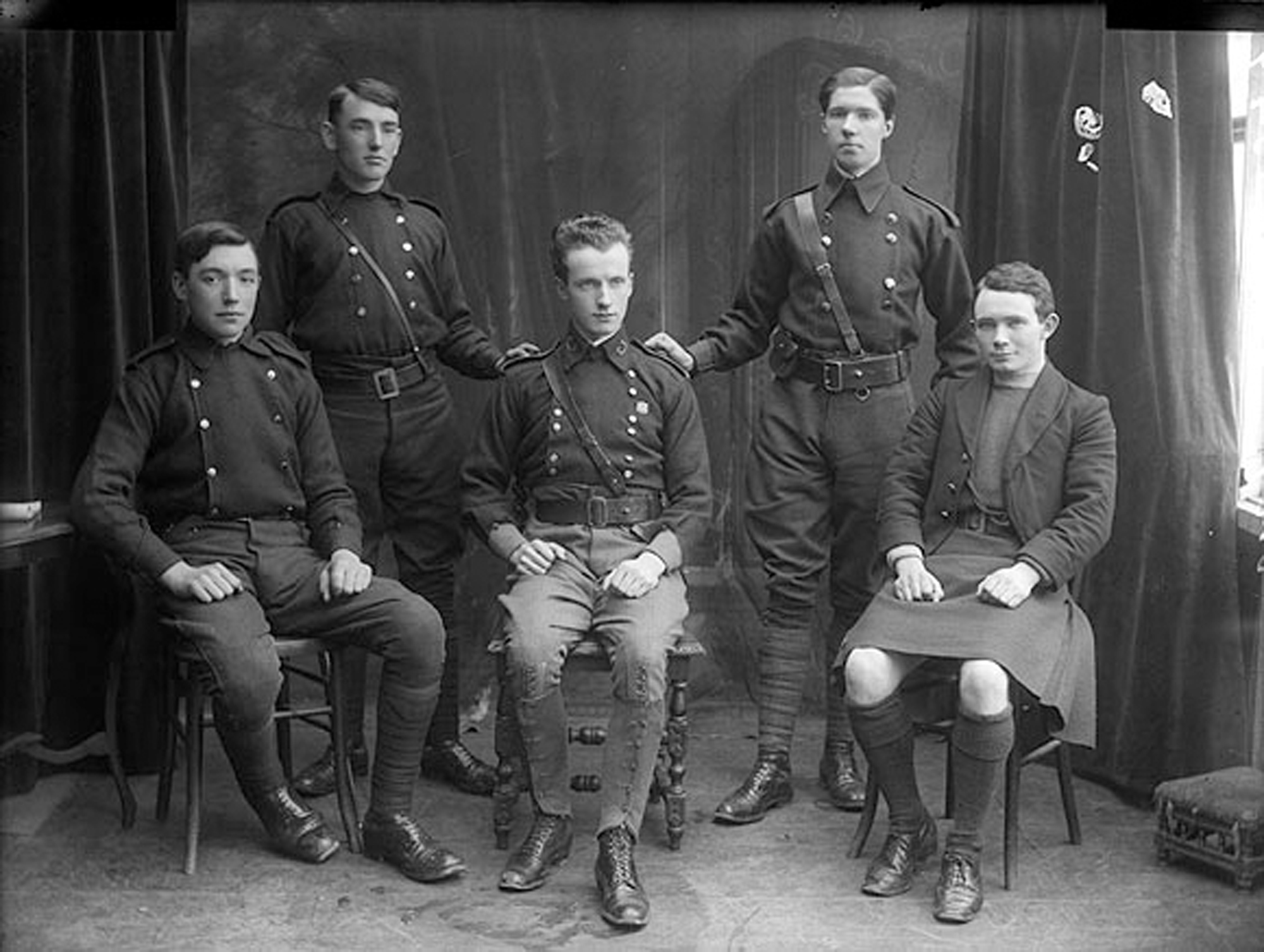
Between 1912 and 1914 Fianna Éireann:Front row (left to right) Patrick Holohan, Michael Lonergan and Con Colbert. Back row (left to right) Garry Holohan and Padraig Ryan.

Colbert was sworn into the IRB by his cousin Art O'Donnell in Art's home in 1908. He joined Fianna Éireann at its inaugural meeting in 1909, and rose to Chief Scout. The following year he became a drill instructor at St. Enda's School, founded by Patrick Pearse. In 1912 he became head of an Irish Republican Brotherhood (IRB) circle within the Fianna started by Bulmer Hobson. During 1913 he was one of a number of Fianna who conducted military training at the Forester's Hall in Rutland Square (now Parnell Square), and in November that year he joined the Provisional Committee of the newly formed Irish Volunteers.

== Easter Rising ==
In the weeks leading up to the Rising, he acted as bodyguard for Thomas Clarke. Before the Rising, because he lived out of the city he stayed with the Cooney family in the city centre. During Easter Week, he fought at Watkin's Brewery, Jameson's Distillery and Marrowbone Lane. Thomas MacDonagh at 3.15 p.m. Sunday, 30 April surrendered to Brigadier-General Lowe. MacDonagh then went around the garrisons under his command to arrange for their surrender.

Colbert surrendered with the Marrowbone Lane Garrison along with the South Dublin Union Garrison, which had been led by Éamonn Ceannt. It has been claimed that when the order to surrender was issued, he assumed the command of his unit to save the life of his superior officer, who was a married man. However, this seems to have been a matter of luck - the well known Colbert was picked out immediately by Dublin detectives who had often seen him drilling Fianna Éireann and speaking at anti-recruiting meetings.

They were marched to Richmond Barracks, where Colbert would later be court-martialled. Transferred to Kilmainham Gaol, he was told on Sunday 7 May that he was to be shot the following morning. He wrote no fewer than ten letters during his time in prison. During this time in detention, he did not allow any visits from his family; writing to his sister, he said a visit "would grieve us both too much".

== Execution ==
The night before his execution he sent for Mrs. Ó Murchadha who was also being held prisoner. He told her he was "proud to die for such a cause. I will be passing away at the dawning of the day." Holding his bible, he told her he was leaving it to his sister. He handed her three buttons from his volunteer uniform, telling her "They left me nothing else," before asking her when she heard the volleys of shots in the morning for Éamonn Ceannt, Michael Mallin and himself would she say a Hail Mary for the souls of the departed. The soldier who was guarding the prisoner began crying according to Mrs. Ó Murchadha, and recorded him saying "If only we could die such deaths".

Colbert was shot by firing squad the next morning on 8 May 1916.

== Legacy ==
- Colbert Railway Station in Limerick city is named after him.
- Con Colbert Road in Dublin is named in his honour.
- Fianna Fáil Cumann in the University of Limerick is named after him.
- Colbert Street in his native Athea, County Limerick is named after him, as is the local community hall.
- Colbert Avenue and Colbert Park Janesboro, Limerick City are also named after him.

On 4 May 1958 a plaque was erected over a bed in Barringtons Hospital, County Limerick. The plaque was later removed.

In May 2016, one hundred years after his execution, a full-scale limestone sculpture of him was unveiled at the gable of his one-time house in Moanlena, County Limerick.
