= Patrick Clancy (Irish politician) =

Irish politician (1877–1947)

Teachta Dála
- In office August 1923 – February 1932
- Constituency: Limerick

Personal details
- Born: 17 March 1877 Bruff, County Limerick, Ireland
- Died: 21 February 1947 (aged 69) County Limerick, Ireland
- Party: Labour Party
- Spouse: Bridget Higgins (m. 1911; died 1921)
- Children: 4
- Relatives: George Clancy (brother)
- Education: St Patrick's seminary, Bruff

Patrick Clancy (17 March 1877 – 21 February 1947) was an Irish Labour Party politician.

Born in Bruff, County Limerick in 1877, to John Clancy and Bridget Clancy (née Farrell). He was educated at St Patrick's seminary, Bruff, and became carpenter like his father.

A committed trade unionist, he was prominent in the Irish Land and Labour Association, and was a member of the Irish Volunteers, and the East Limerick brigade of the IRA.

He was elected to Dáil Éireann as a Labour Party Teachta Dála (TD) for the Limerick constituency at the 1923 general election. He was re-elected at the June 1927 and September 1927 general elections. He lost his seat at the 1932 general election, running as Independent Labour.

He married Bridget Higgins in 1911, and they had four children.

One of his brothers was George Clancy, who was assassinated in 1921 by the Black and Tans while serving as Mayor of Limerick.

Dáil	Election	Deputy (Party)	Deputy (Party)	Deputy (Party)	Deputy (Party)	Deputy (Party)	Deputy (Party)	Deputy (Party)
4th	1923	Richard Hayes (CnaG)	James Ledden (CnaG)	Seán Carroll (Rep)	James Colbert (Rep)	John Nolan (CnaG)	Patrick Clancy (Lab)	Patrick Hogan (FP)
4th	1924 by-election	Richard O'Connell (CnaG)	James Ledden (CnaG)	Seán Carroll (Rep)	James Colbert (Rep)	John Nolan (CnaG)	Patrick Clancy (Lab)	Patrick Hogan (FP)
5th	1927 (Jun)	Richard O'Connell (CnaG)	Gilbert Hewson (Ind.)	Tadhg Crowley (FF)	James Colbert (FF)	George C. Bennett (CnaG)	Patrick Clancy (Lab)	Michael Keyes (Lab)
6th	1927 (Sep)	Richard O'Connell (CnaG)	Daniel Bourke (FF)	Tadhg Crowley (FF)	James Colbert (FF)	George C. Bennett (CnaG)	Patrick Clancy (Lab)	John Nolan (CnaG)
7th	1932	James Reidy (CnaG)	Daniel Bourke (FF)	Tadhg Crowley (FF)	James Colbert (FF)	George C. Bennett (CnaG)	Robert Ryan (FF)	John O'Shaughnessy (FP)
8th	1933	James Reidy (CnaG)	Daniel Bourke (FF)	Tadhg Crowley (FF)	Donnchadh Ó Briain (FF)	George C. Bennett (CnaG)	Robert Ryan (FF)	Michael Keyes (Lab)
9th	1937	John O'Shaughnessy (FG)	Daniel Bourke (FF)	Michael Colbert (FF)	Donnchadh Ó Briain (FF)	George C. Bennett (FG)	Robert Ryan (FF)	Michael Keyes (Lab)
10th	1938	James Reidy (FG)	Daniel Bourke (FF)	Tadhg Crowley (FF)	Donnchadh Ó Briain (FF)	George C. Bennett (FG)	Robert Ryan (FF)	Michael Keyes (Lab)
11th	1943	James Reidy (FG)	Daniel Bourke (FF)	Tadhg Crowley (FF)	Donnchadh Ó Briain (FF)	George C. Bennett (FG)	Robert Ryan (FF)	Michael Keyes (Lab)
12th	1944	James Reidy (FG)	Daniel Bourke (FF)	Michael Colbert (FF)	Donnchadh Ó Briain (FF)	George C. Bennett (FG)	Robert Ryan (FF)	Michael Keyes (Lab)
13th	1948	Constituency abolished. See Limerick East and Limerick West						

Dáil	Election	Deputy (Party)	Deputy (Party)	Deputy (Party)
31st	2011	Niall Collins (FF)	Dan Neville (FG)	Patrick O'Donovan (FG)
32nd	2016	Constituency abolished. See Limerick County		
