= Donnchadh Ó Briain =

Irish Fianna Fáil politician (1897–1981)

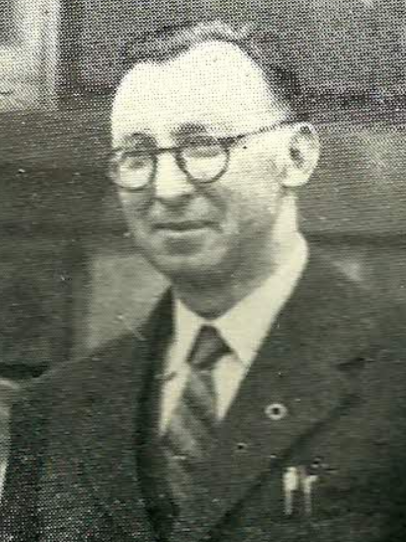
- Ó Briain in 1951

Parliamentary Secretary
- 1957–1961: Government Chief Whip
- 1957–1961: Defence
- 1951–1954: Government Chief Whip
- 1951–1954: Defence

Teachta Dála
- In office February 1948 – June 1969
- Constituency: Limerick West
- In office January 1933 – February 1948
- Constituency: Limerick

Personal details
- Born: 17 November 1897 Limerick, Ireland
- Died: 22 September 1981 (aged 83) Limerick, Ireland
- Party: Fianna Fáil
- Spouse: Eileen Liston (m. 1940)

Donnchadh Ó Briain (17 November 1897 – 22 September 1981) was an Irish Fianna Fáil politician and Conradh na Gaeilge activist. He was elected to Dáil Éireann at the 1933 general election.

He was born 17 November 1897 in Knockaderry, County Limerick, one of two sons and a daughter of David O'Brien, a creamery manager, and Kathleen O'Brien (née Casey). He was educated at Ahalin national school and then at the Redemptorist College at Mount St Alphonsus, Limerick city, but was prevented from going to university by bouts of ill health.

On leaving school he worked in the creamery managed by his father for a number of years. By 1917, he had become involved in the independence movement as a member of Sinn Féin and later, of the West Limerick brigade of the Irish Republican Army. He was involved in the republican courts in Limerick and took the anti-treaty side in the Irish Civil War.

He was deeply involved in the Conradh na Gaeilge, which he also joined in 1917, having been influenced by Fr Tomás de Bhál. In 1920 Ó Briain was appointed Conradh na Gaeilge organiser for County Limerick, and from 1925 he served in that role for all of Munster province, founding numerous branches of the league. From 1928 to 1932 he served as general secretary of the Conradh na Gaeilge and also intermittently edited Fáinne an Lae.

A founder member of Fianna Fáil in 1926, he stood unsuccessfully in Limerick at the 1932 general election. He served as a Fianna Fáil Teachta Dála (TD) for the Limerick and from 1948 for Limerick West constituencies until 1969 when he retired from politics. He served in the governments of Éamon de Valera and Seán Lemass as Government Chief Whip.

Political offices
Preceded by Liam Cosgrave	Government Chief Whip; 1951–1954	Succeeded by Denis J. O'Sullivan
Preceded by Brendan Corish	Parliamentary Secretary to the Minister for Defence; 1951–1954	Succeeded by Denis J. O'Sullivan
Preceded by Denis J. O'Sullivan	Government Chief Whip; 1957–1961	Succeeded by Joseph Brennan
Preceded by Denis J. O'Sullivan	Parliamentary Secretary to the Minister for Defence; 1957–1961	Succeeded by Joseph Brennan

Dáil	Election	Deputy (Party)	Deputy (Party)	Deputy (Party)	Deputy (Party)	Deputy (Party)	Deputy (Party)	Deputy (Party)
4th	1923	Richard Hayes (CnaG)	James Ledden (CnaG)	Seán Carroll (Rep)	James Colbert (Rep)	John Nolan (CnaG)	Patrick Clancy (Lab)	Patrick Hogan (FP)
4th	1924 by-election	Richard O'Connell (CnaG)	James Ledden (CnaG)	Seán Carroll (Rep)	James Colbert (Rep)	John Nolan (CnaG)	Patrick Clancy (Lab)	Patrick Hogan (FP)
5th	1927 (Jun)	Richard O'Connell (CnaG)	Gilbert Hewson (Ind.)	Tadhg Crowley (FF)	James Colbert (FF)	George C. Bennett (CnaG)	Patrick Clancy (Lab)	Michael Keyes (Lab)
6th	1927 (Sep)	Richard O'Connell (CnaG)	Daniel Bourke (FF)	Tadhg Crowley (FF)	James Colbert (FF)	George C. Bennett (CnaG)	Patrick Clancy (Lab)	John Nolan (CnaG)
7th	1932	James Reidy (CnaG)	Daniel Bourke (FF)	Tadhg Crowley (FF)	James Colbert (FF)	George C. Bennett (CnaG)	Robert Ryan (FF)	John O'Shaughnessy (FP)
8th	1933	James Reidy (CnaG)	Daniel Bourke (FF)	Tadhg Crowley (FF)	Donnchadh Ó Briain (FF)	George C. Bennett (CnaG)	Robert Ryan (FF)	Michael Keyes (Lab)
9th	1937	John O'Shaughnessy (FG)	Daniel Bourke (FF)	Michael Colbert (FF)	Donnchadh Ó Briain (FF)	George C. Bennett (FG)	Robert Ryan (FF)	Michael Keyes (Lab)
10th	1938	James Reidy (FG)	Daniel Bourke (FF)	Tadhg Crowley (FF)	Donnchadh Ó Briain (FF)	George C. Bennett (FG)	Robert Ryan (FF)	Michael Keyes (Lab)
11th	1943	James Reidy (FG)	Daniel Bourke (FF)	Tadhg Crowley (FF)	Donnchadh Ó Briain (FF)	George C. Bennett (FG)	Robert Ryan (FF)	Michael Keyes (Lab)
12th	1944	James Reidy (FG)	Daniel Bourke (FF)	Michael Colbert (FF)	Donnchadh Ó Briain (FF)	George C. Bennett (FG)	Robert Ryan (FF)	Michael Keyes (Lab)
13th	1948	Constituency abolished. See Limerick East and Limerick West						

Dáil	Election	Deputy (Party)	Deputy (Party)	Deputy (Party)
31st	2011	Niall Collins (FF)	Dan Neville (FG)	Patrick O'Donovan (FG)
32nd	2016	Constituency abolished. See Limerick County		

Dáil	Election	Deputy (Party)	Deputy (Party)	Deputy (Party)
13th	1948	James Collins (FF)	Donnchadh Ó Briain (FF)	David Madden (FG)
14th	1951	James Collins (FF)	Donnchadh Ó Briain (FF)	David Madden (FG)
15th	1954	James Collins (FF)	Donnchadh Ó Briain (FF)	David Madden (FG)
15th	1955 by-election	James Collins (FF)	Donnchadh Ó Briain (FF)	Michael Colbert (FF)
16th	1957	James Collins (FF)	Donnchadh Ó Briain (FF)	Denis Jones (FG)
17th	1961	James Collins (FF)	Donnchadh Ó Briain (FF)	Denis Jones (FG)
18th	1965	James Collins (FF)	Donnchadh Ó Briain (FF)	Denis Jones (FG)
18th	1967 by-election	Gerry Collins (FF)	Donnchadh Ó Briain (FF)	Denis Jones (FG)
19th	1969	Gerry Collins (FF)	Michael J. Noonan (FF)	Denis Jones (FG)
20th	1973	Gerry Collins (FF)	Michael J. Noonan (FF)	Denis Jones (FG)
21st	1977	Gerry Collins (FF)	Michael J. Noonan (FF)	William O'Brien (FG)
22nd	1981	Gerry Collins (FF)	Michael J. Noonan (FF)	William O'Brien (FG)
23rd	1982 (Feb)	Gerry Collins (FF)	Michael J. Noonan (FF)	William O'Brien (FG)
24th	1982 (Nov)	Gerry Collins (FF)	Michael J. Noonan (FF)	William O'Brien (FG)
25th	1987	Gerry Collins (FF)	Michael J. Noonan (FF)	John McCoy (PDs)
26th	1989	Gerry Collins (FF)	Michael J. Noonan (FF)	Michael Finucane (FG)
27th	1992	Gerry Collins (FF)	Michael J. Noonan (FF)	Michael Finucane (FG)
28th	1997	Michael Collins (FF)	Dan Neville (FG)	Michael Finucane (FG)
29th	2002	Michael Collins (FF)	Dan Neville (FG)	John Cregan (FF)
30th	2007	Niall Collins (FF)	Dan Neville (FG)	John Cregan (FF)
31st	2011	Constituency abolished. See Limerick and Kerry North–West Limerick		
