= Limerick (Dáil constituency) =

Dáil constituency (1923–1948, 2011–2016)

- Former Dáil constituency
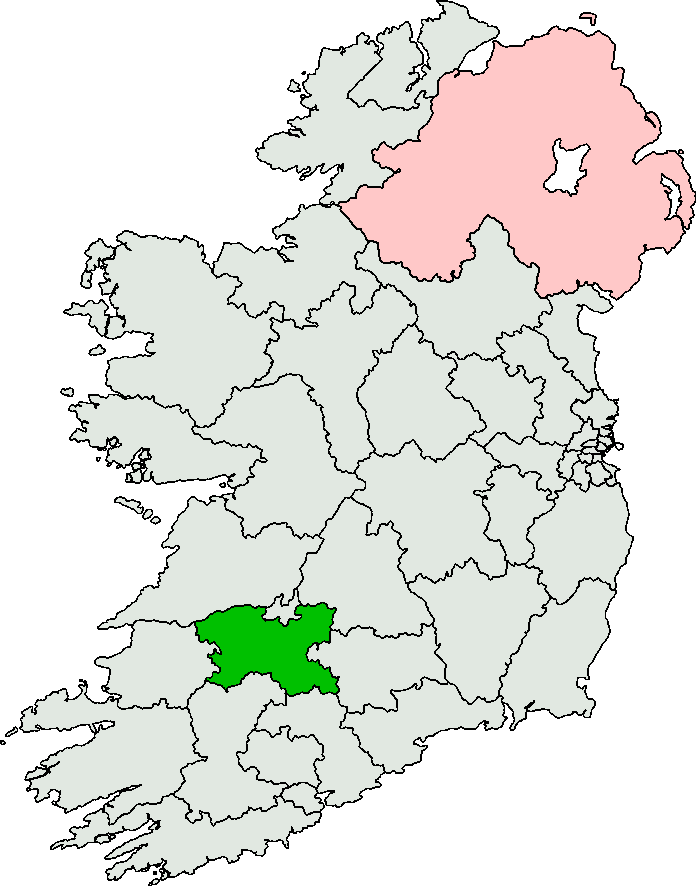
- Location of Limerick within Ireland

Former constituency
- Created: 2011
- Abolished: 2016
- Seats: 3
- Local government area: County Limerick
- Created from: Limerick East; Limerick West
- Replaced by: Limerick County

Limerick
- Former Dáil constituency
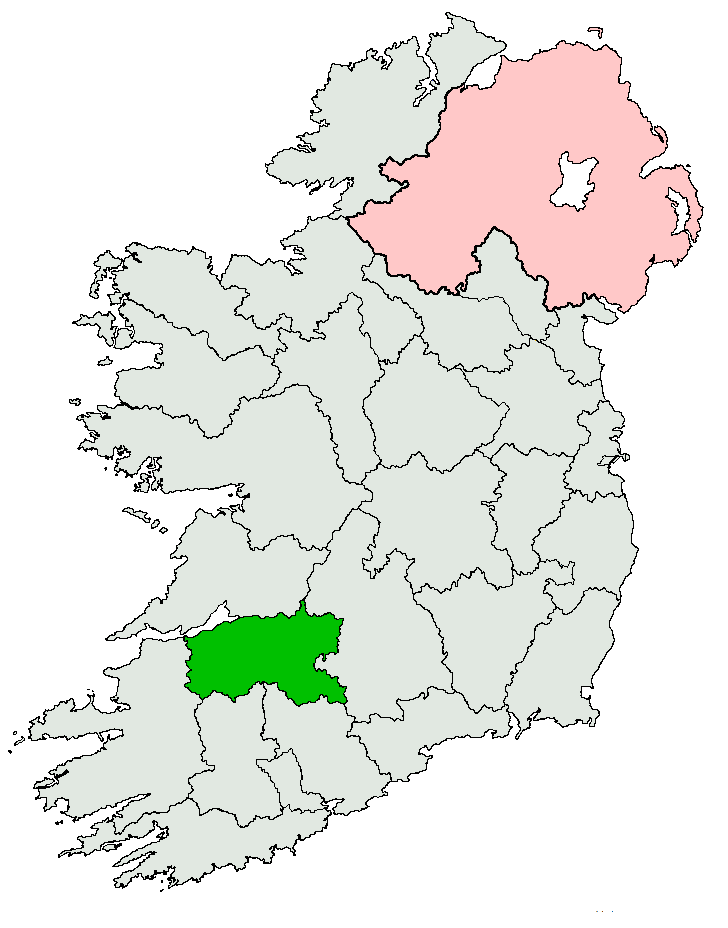
- Location of Limerick within Ireland

Former constituency
- Created: 1923
- Abolished: 1948
- Seats: 7
- Local government areas: County Limerick; Limerick City
- Created from: Limerick City–Limerick East; Kerry–Limerick West
- Replaced by: Limerick East; Limerick West

Limerick was a parliamentary constituency represented in Dáil Éireann, the lower house of the Irish parliament or Oireachtas elected on the system of proportional representation by means of the single transferable vote (PR-STV). From 1923 to 1948, it represented the whole city and county of Limerick. On its second creation, from 2011 to 2016, it represented the rural part of the county of Limerick, other than in its neighbouring constituencies of Kerry North–West Limerick and Limerick City.

== History and boundaries ==
=== 1923–1948 ===
The constituency was first created as a 7-seat constituency under the Electoral Act 1923 for the 1923 general election to Dáil Éireann; those elected comprised the 4th Dáil. It succeeded the constituencies of Limerick City–Limerick East and Kerry–Limerick West which were used to elect members to the Second Dáil and the 3rd Dáil.

It covered Limerick city and all of County Limerick. It was abolished under the Electoral (Amendment) Act 1947, when it was replaced by the two new constituencies of Limerick East and Limerick West.

=== 2011–2016 ===
The Constituency Commission proposed in 2007 that at the next general election a new constituency called Limerick be created.

It was established by the Electoral (Amendment) Act 2009 when it partially replaced the former constituencies of Limerick East and Limerick West. Most of the rural parts of the Limerick East constituency were transferred to the Limerick constituency and the western parts of the Limerick West constituency were transferred to the Kerry North–West Limerick constituency. It was represented only at the 2011 general election, electing 3 TDs.

The 2009 Act defined the constituency as:

"The county of Limerick, except the parts thereof which are comprised in the constituencies of Limerick City and Kerry North–West Limerick."

It was abolished at the 2016 general election and replaced by the Limerick County constituency.

== TDs ==
=== TDs 1923–1948 ===
Teachtaí Dála (TDs) for Limerick 1923–1948
Key to parties: CnaG = Cumann na nGaedheal; FP = Farmers' Party; FF = Fianna Fáil; FG = Fine Gael; Ind. = Independent; Lab = Labour; Rep = Republican
Dáil	Election	Deputy (Party)	Deputy (Party)	Deputy (Party)	Deputy (Party)	Deputy (Party)	Deputy (Party)	Deputy (Party)
4th	1923	Richard Hayes (CnaG)	James Ledden (CnaG)	Seán Carroll (Rep)	James Colbert (Rep)	John Nolan (CnaG)	Patrick Clancy (Lab)	Patrick Hogan (FP)
4th	1924 by-election	Richard O'Connell (CnaG)	James Ledden (CnaG)	Seán Carroll (Rep)	James Colbert (Rep)	John Nolan (CnaG)	Patrick Clancy (Lab)	Patrick Hogan (FP)
5th	1927 (Jun)	Richard O'Connell (CnaG)	Gilbert Hewson (Ind.)	Tadhg Crowley (FF)	James Colbert (FF)	George C. Bennett (CnaG)	Patrick Clancy (Lab)	Michael Keyes (Lab)
6th	1927 (Sep)	Richard O'Connell (CnaG)	Daniel Bourke (FF)	Tadhg Crowley (FF)	James Colbert (FF)	George C. Bennett (CnaG)	Patrick Clancy (Lab)	John Nolan (CnaG)
7th	1932	James Reidy (CnaG)	Daniel Bourke (FF)	Tadhg Crowley (FF)	James Colbert (FF)	George C. Bennett (CnaG)	Robert Ryan (FF)	John O'Shaughnessy (FP)
8th	1933	James Reidy (CnaG)	Daniel Bourke (FF)	Tadhg Crowley (FF)	Donnchadh Ó Briain (FF)	George C. Bennett (CnaG)	Robert Ryan (FF)	Michael Keyes (Lab)
9th	1937	John O'Shaughnessy (FG)	Daniel Bourke (FF)	Michael Colbert (FF)	Donnchadh Ó Briain (FF)	George C. Bennett (FG)	Robert Ryan (FF)	Michael Keyes (Lab)
10th	1938	James Reidy (FG)	Daniel Bourke (FF)	Tadhg Crowley (FF)	Donnchadh Ó Briain (FF)	George C. Bennett (FG)	Robert Ryan (FF)	Michael Keyes (Lab)
11th	1943	James Reidy (FG)	Daniel Bourke (FF)	Tadhg Crowley (FF)	Donnchadh Ó Briain (FF)	George C. Bennett (FG)	Robert Ryan (FF)	Michael Keyes (Lab)
12th	1944	James Reidy (FG)	Daniel Bourke (FF)	Michael Colbert (FF)	Donnchadh Ó Briain (FF)	George C. Bennett (FG)	Robert Ryan (FF)	Michael Keyes (Lab)
13th	1948	Constituency abolished. See Limerick East and Limerick West						

Note: The columns in this table are used only for presentational purposes, and no significance should be attached to the order of columns. For details of the order in which seats were won at each election, see the detailed results of that election.

=== TDs 2011–2016 ===
Teachtaí Dála (TDs) for Limerick 2011–2016
Key to parties: FF = Fianna Fáil; FG = Fine Gael
Dáil	Election	Deputy (Party)	Deputy (Party)	Deputy (Party)
31st	2011	Niall Collins (FF)	Dan Neville (FG)	Patrick O'Donovan (FG)
32nd	2016	Constituency abolished. See Limerick County		

Note: The columns in this table are used only for presentational purposes, and no significance should be attached to the order of columns. For details of the order in which seats were won at each election, see the detailed results of that election.

== Elections ==
*: Outgoing TD

=== 2011 general election ===
2011 general election: Limerick
Party	Candidate	FPv%	Count			
Party	Candidate	FPv%	1	2	3	4
Fianna Fáil	Niall Collins	20.8	9,361	9,488	9,753	10,809
Fine Gael	Dan Neville	20.4	9,176	9,347	10,691	11,728
Fine Gael	Patrick O'Donovan	19.1	8,597	8,793	10,351	11,316
Labour	James Heffernan	17.6	7,910	8,236	8,893	10,104
Independent	John Dillon	9.8	4,395	4,767	5,075	
Fine Gael	William O'Donnell	9.2	4,152	4,222		
Independent	Con Cremin	1.0	430			
Independent	Seamus Sherlock	0.9	419			
Green	Stephen Wall	0.8	354			
Independent	Patrick O'Doherty	0.5	247			
Electorate: 65,083 Valid: 45,041 Spoilt: 471 (1.0%) Quota: 11,261 Turnout: 45,512 (69.9%)

=== 1944 general election ===
1944 general election: Limerick
Party	Candidate	FPv%	Count						
Party	Candidate	FPv%	1	2	3	4	5	6	7
Fianna Fáil	Daniel Bourke	14.1	8,415						
Labour	Michael Keyes	13.7	8,159						
Fianna Fáil	Donnchadh Ó Briain	12.5	7,481						
Fianna Fáil	Robert Ryan	9.8	5,865	6,027	6,071	6,210	8,925		
Fine Gael	James Reidy	9.6	5,762	5,835	7,181	7,382	7,572		
Fine Gael	George C. Bennett	8.9	5,291	5,305	6,504	6,575	6,780	6,820	6,865
Fianna Fáil	Tadhg Crowley	8.7	5,182	5,383	5,476	5,586			
Clann na Talmhan	Patrick Fitzsimons	8.3	4,950	4,955	5,763	5,832	6,090	6,121	6,158
Fianna Fáil	Michael Colbert	8.1	4,852	5,343	5,518	5,623	7,391	8,781	
Fine Gael	David Madden	6.3	3,754	3,759					
Electorate: 84,036 Valid: 59,711 Quota: 7,464 Turnout: 71.1%

=== 1943 general election ===
1943 general election: Limerick
Party	Candidate	FPv%	Count											
Party	Candidate	FPv%	1	2	3	4	5	6	7	8	9	10	11	12
Fianna Fáil	Daniel Bourke	14.4	9,324											
Fianna Fáil	Donnchadh Ó Briain	12.6	8,131											
Labour	Michael Keyes	11.7	7,578	7,671	8,237									
Fine Gael	James Reidy	9.6	6,234	6,300	6,312	6,315	6,422	6,671	7,253	7,476	7,573	8,787		
Fianna Fáil	Tadhg Crowley	7.8	5,072	5,763	5,886	5,890	5,983	6,182	6,259	6,627	8,580			
Fianna Fáil	Robert Ryan	7.3	4,701	4,874	4,885	4,886	5,111	5,169	5,288	5,748	6,378	6,487	6,546	6,580
Fine Gael	George C. Bennett	7.0	4,529	4,541	4,552	4,552	4,889	6,171	7,279	7,576	7,627	8,769		
Fianna Fáil	Seán Hartney	4.8	3,116	3,237	3,298	3,303	3,335	3,351	3,413	3,535				
Fine Gael	Timothy O'Connell	4.1	2,675	2,678	2,737	2,743	2,763	2,944	3,422	3,582	3,691			
Clann na Talmhan	Patrick Fitzsimons	4.0	2,601	2,606	2,643	2,645	3,681	3,787	4,055	4,164	4,521	5,098	5,462	5,897
Fine Gael	John MacNamara	3.9	2,513	2,518	2,526	2,527	2,600	2,834						
Fine Gael	Denis Quish	3.6	2,351	2,353	2,358	2,359	2,518							
Clann na Talmhan	Con Ryan	3.4	2,195	2,208	2,209	2,210								
Labour	Seán Hayes	3.3	2,110	2,117	2,862	2,978	3,053	3,153	3,197					
Labour	Patrick Costelloe	2.5	1,645	1,681										
Electorate: 84,036 Valid: 64,775 Quota: 8,097 Turnout: 77.1%

=== 1938 general election ===
1938 general election: Limerick
Party	Candidate	FPv%	Count							
Party	Candidate	FPv%	1	2	3	4	5	6	7	8
Fine Gael	James Reidy	14.6	9,812							
Fianna Fáil	Daniel Bourke	13.5	9,058							
Fianna Fáil	Donnchadh Ó Briain	12.1	8,099	8,117	8,132	8,249	8,306	11,286		
Fianna Fáil	Tadhg Crowley	10.7	7,217	7,242	7,305	7,668	7,774	10,206		
Fine Gael	George C. Bennett	9.6	6,474	7,049	7,587	7,737	7,747	7,800	7,820	7,867
Fianna Fáil	Robert Ryan	9.1	6,117	6,142	6,165	6,324	6,400	6,699	9,056	
Labour	Michael Keyes	8.7	5,836	6,036	6,086	7,327	7,371	7,729	7,879	8,323
Fianna Fáil	Michael Colbert	8.5	5,741	5,779	5,908	5,974	6,338			
Fine Gael	John O'Shaughnessy	8.5	5,726	6,039	6,294	6,369	6,372	6,493	6,585	6,728
Labour	Seán Quinn	3.2	2,179	2,214	2,225					
Fine Gael	Michael Burke	1.4	924	1,109						
Electorate: 81,048 Valid: 67,183 Quota: 8,398 Turnout: 82.9%

=== 1937 general election ===
1937 general election: Limerick
Party	Candidate	FPv%	Count									
Party	Candidate	FPv%	1	2	3	4	5	6	7	8	9	10
Labour	Michael Keyes	16.8	11,011									
Fianna Fáil	Daniel Bourke	12.4	8,106	8,633								
Fianna Fáil	Michael Colbert	10.6	6,955	7,428	7,497	7,690	7,732	7,882	7,889	7,891	9,578	
Fine Gael	George C. Bennett	9.4	6,131	6,290	6,840	6,861	8,956					
Fine Gael	James Reidy	8.9	5,834	6,165	6,276	6,332	6,670	7,230	7,475	7,714	7,872	7,902
Fianna Fáil	Donnchadh Ó Briain	8.6	5,663	5,944	6,002	6,045	6,075	6,303	6,309	6,310	7,079	7,948
Fianna Fáil	Robert Ryan	7.2	4,698	5,140	5,297	5,336	5,387	5,407	5,414	5,421	7,536	8,024
Fianna Fáil	Tadhg Crowley	6.9	4,544	4,900	4,953	5,038	5,129	5,162	5,175	5,176		
Fine Gael	John O'Shaughnessy	6.7	4,361	4,430	4,565	4,566	5,038	7,954	8,441			
Fine Gael	Timothy O'Connell	5.4	3,537	3,587	3,639	3,642	4,021					
Fine Gael	Liam Fraher	5.1	3,339	3,402	3,563	3,564						
Independent	Thomas Lloyd	2.0	1,343	1,412								
Electorate: 81,397 Valid: 65,522 Quota: 8,191 Turnout: 80.5%

=== 1933 general election ===
1933 general election: Limerick
Party	Candidate	FPv%	Count										
Party	Candidate	FPv%	1	2	3	4	5	6	7	8	9	10	11
Fianna Fáil	Daniel Bourke	12.1	7,980	8,002	8,019	8,057	8,075	8,079	8,620				
Fianna Fáil	Donnchadh Ó Briain	11.2	7,383	7,410	7,431	7,507	7,518	7,523	9,594				
Fianna Fáil	Robert Ryan	10.6	6,956	7,007	7,078	7,111	7,123	7,131	7,332	8,508			
Fianna Fáil	Tadhg Crowley	9.9	6,536	6,616	6,641	6,679	6,685	6,688	9,130				
Fianna Fáil	James Colbert	8.8	5,803	5,873	5,890	5,982	5,997	6,002					
Labour	Michael Keyes	8.8	5,798	5,837	5,946	6,079	6,113	6,154	6,631	6,784	7,593	7,901	8,160
Cumann na nGaedheal	George C. Bennett	8.8	5,791	6,209	7,798	10,430							
Cumann na nGaedheal	James Reidy	8.3	5,443	5,474	5,939	7,434	9,217						
Cumann na nGaedheal	John Nolan	6.5	4,265	4,414	5,502								
Cumann na nGaedheal	Richard O'Connell	5.4	3,560	3,725									
National Centre Party	John O'Shaughnessy	5.1	3,388	5,326	5,611	6,524	6,835	7,746	7,927	7,952	8,033	8,062	8,071
National Centre Party	John Canty	4.6	3,010										
Electorate: 78,350 Valid: 65,913 Quota: 8,240 Turnout: 84.1%

=== 1932 general election ===
The number of and full figures for later counts are not available. Bennett, Bourke, Colbert, Crowley, O'Shaughnessy, Reidy and Ryan were all elected.

1932 general election: Limerick
Party	Candidate	FPv%	Count						
Party	Candidate	FPv%	1	2	3	4	5	6	7
Fianna Fáil	Daniel Bourke	12.4	7,677	7,775					
Fianna Fáil	Robert Ryan	10.8	6,645	6,667	6,708	6,722	7,211	7,760	
Fianna Fáil	James Colbert	9.9	6,100	6,270	6,371	6,443	6,834	8,452	
Cumann na nGaedheal	George C. Bennett	9.6	5,919	5,951	6,298	6,649	6,826	6,866	N/A
Cumann na nGaedheal	James Reidy	8.2	5,088	5,142	5,208	5,495	5,537	5,572	N/A
Fianna Fáil	Tadhg Crowley	8.0	4,966	5,024	5,082	5,112	5,477	6,176	N/A
Farmers' Party	John O'Shaughnessy	7.9	4,887	4,903	5,417	5,647	5,757	6,065	N/A
Cumann na nGaedheal	Richard O'Connell	5.8	3,573	3,590	3,627	3,894	4,005	4,043	N/A
Fianna Fáil	Donnchadh Ó Briain	5.4	3,334	3,365	3,413	3,453	3,536		
Cumann na nGaedheal	John Nolan	5.4	3,325	3,339	3,435	4,155	4,237	4,279	N/A
Labour	Michael Keyes	5.0	3,101	3,787	3,875	3,955	4,441	4,592	N/A
Independent	Patrick Clancy	3.4	2,105	2,324	2,368	2,420			
Cumann na nGaedheal	David Madden	3.3	2,045	2,067	2,178				
Independent	Gilbert Hewson	2.5	1,562	1,585					
Labour	Daniel Clancy	2.4	1,486						
Electorate: 76,959 Valid: 61,813 Quota: 7,727 Turnout: 80.3%

=== September 1927 general election ===
September 1927 general election: Limerick
Party	Candidate	FPv%	Count								
Party	Candidate	FPv%	1	2	3	4	5	6	7	8	9
Cumann na nGaedheal	George C. Bennett	14.0	7,993								
Fianna Fáil	James Colbert	11.2	6,385	6,404	6,592	6,617	6,617	7,020	7,080	7,270	
Fianna Fáil	Daniel Bourke	10.0	5,711	5,764	6,720	6,773	6,774	6,837	6,856	7,221	
Cumann na nGaedheal	John Nolan	9.5	5,390	5,518	5,544	7,306					
Cumann na nGaedheal	Richard O'Connell	9.4	5,354	5,508	5,612	6,429	6,594	8,189			
Fianna Fáil	Tadhg Crowley	8.1	4,625	4,639	5,825	5,867	5,868	5,955	6,033	6,405	7,376
Labour	Patrick Clancy	7.8	4,447	4,508	4,740	4,803	4,804	4,921	4,981	8,440	
Labour	Michael Keyes	7.5	4,290	4,309	4,446	4,626	4,631	4,790	4,867		
Farmers' Party	Cornelius O'Sullivan	6.0	3,434	3,451	3,539	3,612	3,621				
Independent	Gilbert Hewson	5.9	3,352	3,410	3,493	3,698	3,705	4,635	5,303	5,492	5,844
Fianna Fáil	Robert Ryan	5.4	3,049	3,054							
Cumann na nGaedheal	Matthew Griffin	5.1	2,898	3,246	3,268						
Electorate: 79,765 Valid: 56,928 Quota: 7,117 Turnout: 71.4%

=== June 1927 general election ===
June 1927 general election: Limerick
Party	Candidate	FPv%	Count																	
Party	Candidate	FPv%	1	2	3	4	5	6	7	8	9	10	11	12	13	14	15	16	17	18
Fianna Fáil	James Colbert	10.3	5,531	5,554	5,585	5,595	5,607	5,632	5,716	5,899	6,605	6,689	6,724							
Cumann na nGaedheal	George C. Bennett	9.6	5,165	5,185	5,265	5,466	6,041	6,245	6,517	6,586	6,660	7,170								
Fianna Fáil	Tadhg Crowley	9.1	4,865	4,940	4,954	5,062	5,082	5,267	5,364	6,568	6,762									
Labour	Michael Keyes	8.2	4,404	4,412	4,436	4,483	4,601	4,629	4,892	4,970	5,431	6,617	6,620	6,689	6,692	6,828				
Cumann na nGaedheal	Richard O'Connell	7.9	4,228	4,248	4,379	4,502	4,816	5,011	5,148	5,262	5,348	5,520	5,520	5,585	5,585	6,045	6,054	6,122	8,660	
Fianna Fáil	Daniel Bourke	7.1	3,795	3,806	3,812	3,817	3,828	3,838	3,889	4,071	4,115	4,183	4,186	4,197	4,202	4,366	4,370			
Labour	Patrick Clancy	5.7	3,086	3,103	3,109	3,195	3,218	3,356	3,478	3,685	3,958	4,211	4,217	4,259	4,262	4,391	4,435	5,757	5,901	6,213
Independent	Gilbert Hewson	5.7	3,054	3,127	3,229	3,352	3,424	3,653	3,848	3,947	4,165	4,443	4,445	4,515	4,517	5,610	5,623	5,881	6,704	7,326
Farmers' Party	Cornelius O'Sullivan	4.9	2,623	2,635	2,697	2,723	2,737	3,048	3,188	3,248	3,605	3,693	3,695	3,715	3,716					
Independent	Matthew Murphy	4.8	2,594	2,615	2,683	2,697	2,710	2,724	2,790	2,803										
Cumann na nGaedheal	John Nolan	4.6	2,446	2,463	2,717	2,793	3,040	3,109	3,254	3,270	3,461	3,567	3,568	3,726	3,726	4,584	4,595	4,653		
National League	Michael Joyce	4.4	2,350	2,438	2,452	2,464	2,566	2,603	2,936	2,964	3,022									
Fianna Fáil	Robert Ryan	3.7	2,006	2,025	2,027	2,104	2,117	2,275	2,369											
Independent	Matthew Quillinan	3.4	1,848	1,852	1,877	1,945	2,032	2,081												
Cumann na nGaedheal	Matthew Griffin	3.0	1,613	1,627	1,658	1,665														
Farmers' Party	William Condon	2.8	1,477	1,527	1,542	1,718	1,736													
Independent	John Smith	2.2	1,205	1,208	1,213															
Cumann na nGaedheal	John O'Mahony	1.7	886	890																
National League	John Coleman	0.9	503																	
Electorate: 79,765 Valid: 53,679 Quota: 6,710 Turnout: 67.3%

=== 1924 by-election ===
Following the resignation of Cumann na nGaedheal TD Richard Hayes, a by-election was held on 28 May 1924. The seat was won by the Cumann na nGaedheal candidate Richard O'Connell.

1924 by-election: Limerick
Party	Candidate	FPv%	Count
Party	Candidate	FPv%	1
Cumann na nGaedheal	Richard O'Connell	54.3	28,243
Republican	Tadhg Crowley	45.7	23,738
Electorate: 79,000 Valid: 51,981 Quota: 25,991 Turnout: 65.8%

=== 1923 general election ===
Full figures for the remaining 16 counts are not available. The following are the number of votes unsuccessful candidates had at the time of their elimination though the counts which some eliminations occurred are unknown due to data being unavailable; Mackey 143, Larkin 509, J. O'Brien 766, Cleary 996, O'Callaghan 1,159, W. O'Brien 1,273, Walshe 1,706, Laffin 2,197, Colivet 2,249, Quaide 2,468, Keyes 2,808 and Smyth 3,509

Michael Gallagher notes that newspapers at the time reported there was a 'discrepancy' with the original first count results, leading to a recount. The results below are of the first count which occurred so may not be fully accurate, the results of the recount are unavailable.

1923 general election: Limerick
Party	Candidate	FPv%	Count																
Party	Candidate	FPv%	1	2	3	4	5	6	7	8	9	10	11	12	13	14	15	16	17
Cumann na nGaedheal	Richard Hayes	20.7	10,498																
Cumann na nGaedheal	James Ledden	12.5	6,335	8,256															
Republican	Seán Carroll	11.7	5,946	N/A	N/A	N/A	N/A	N/A	N/A	6,451									
Republican	James Colbert	9.5	4,842	N/A	N/A	N/A	N/A	N/A	N/A	N/A	N/A	N/A	N/A	7,081					
Labour	Matthew Murphy	6.6	3,332	N/A	N/A	N/A	N/A	N/A	N/A	N/A	N/A	N/A	N/A	N/A	N/A	N/A	N/A	N/A	4,774
Labour	Patrick Clancy	6.5	3,305	N/A	N/A	N/A	N/A	N/A	N/A	N/A	N/A	N/A	N/A	N/A	N/A	N/A	N/A	N/A	5,360
Farmers' Party	Bartholomew Laffan	3.3	1,656	N/A	N/A	N/A	N/A	N/A	N/A										
Farmers' Party	John Quaide	3.2	1,619	N/A	N/A	N/A	N/A	N/A	N/A										
Labour	Michael Keyes	3.0	1,549	N/A	N/A	N/A	N/A	N/A	N/A										
Cumann na nGaedheal	John Smyth	3.0	1,547	N/A	N/A	N/A	N/A	N/A	N/A										
Farmers' Party	Patrick Hogan	3.0	1,537	N/A	N/A	N/A	N/A	N/A	N/A	N/A	N/A	N/A	N/A	N/A	N/A	N/A	N/A	N/A	5,932
Republican	Michael Colivet	3.0	1,519	N/A	N/A	N/A	N/A	N/A	N/A										
Cumann na nGaedheal	John Nolan	2.9	1,476	N/A	N/A	N/A	N/A	N/A	N/A	N/A	N/A	N/A	N/A	N/A	N/A	N/A	N/A	7,361 or 7,631	
Cumann na nGaedheal	Patrick Walshe	2.5	1,254	N/A	N/A	N/A	N/A	N/A	N/A										
Farmers' Party	William O'Brien	2.2	1,143	N/A	N/A	N/A	N/A	N/A	N/A										
Republican	Kathleen O'Callaghan	2.2	1,097	N/A	N/A	N/A	N/A	N/A	1,159										
Independent	Michael Cleary	1.8	907	N/A	N/A	N/A	N/A	996											
Labour	James O'Brien	1.3	674	N/A	N/A	N/A	766												
Independent	William Larkin	0.9	466	N/A	N/A	509													
Independent	Anthony Mackey	0.2	114	N/A	143														
Electorate: 79,340 Valid: 50,816 Quota: 6,353 Turnout: 64.1%

== See also ==
- Dáil constituencies
- Politics of the Republic of Ireland
- Historic Dáil constituencies
- Elections in the Republic of Ireland
