= Michael Keyes =

Irish politician and trade unionist (1886–1959)

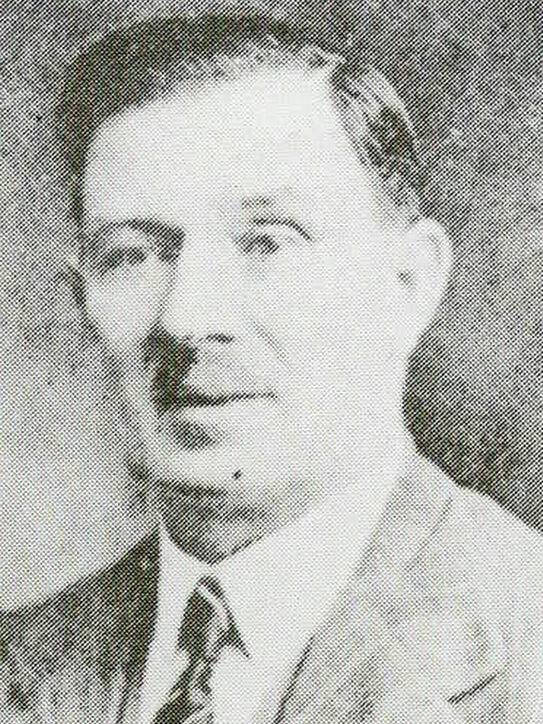
- Keyes in 1927

Minister for Posts and Telegraphs
- In office 2 June 1954 – 20 March 1957
- Taoiseach: John A. Costello
- Preceded by: Erskine H. Childers
- Succeeded by: Neil Blaney

Minister for Local Government
- In office 11 May 1949 – 13 June 1951
- Taoiseach: John A. Costello
- Preceded by: William Norton (acting)
- Succeeded by: Paddy Smith

Teachta Dála
- In office February 1948 – March 1957
- Constituency: Limerick East
- In office January 1933 – February 1948
- In office June 1927 – September 1927
- Constituency: Limerick

Personal details
- Born: 21 March 1886 Limerick, Ireland
- Died: 8 September 1959 (aged 73) Limerick, Ireland
- Party: Labour Party
- Spouse: Sheila Clancy (m. 1916)
- Children: 5
- Relatives: Brian Leddin (grandnephew)
- Occupation: Carpenter

Michael John Keyes (21 March 1886 – 8 September 1959) was an Irish Labour Party politician and trade unionist.

He was born on 21 March 1886 at 41 Blackboy Pike, Limerick city, the second son of Michael Keyes, caretaker, and his wife Hannah (née White). After being educated by the Christian Brothers at Sexton Street, Limerick, he began work as a clerk on the Waterford–Limerick railway line and subsequently served an apprenticeship in carpentry in the workshop of the Great Southern and Western Railway where he remained until 1927.

He had also joined the National Union of Railwaymen and was chairman of the Limerick shopmens’ branch (1915–1926). In 1918 he was active in the anti-conscription campaign and the following year was appointed a delegate to the Irish Trades Union Congress in Drogheda. He was president of the Irish Trades Union Congress in 1943, and in February 1945 represented it at the World Federation of Trade Unions in London.

He was first elected to Dáil Éireann on his second attempt in 1927 as a Labour Party Teachta Dála (TD) for the Limerick constituency. He lost his seat in the second election in 1927 and failed to be elected at the 1932 general election, however, he returned to the Dáil at the 1933 general election.

During the Spanish Civil War he sided with the Irish Christian Front who supported Franco's Nationalists over the Republicans.

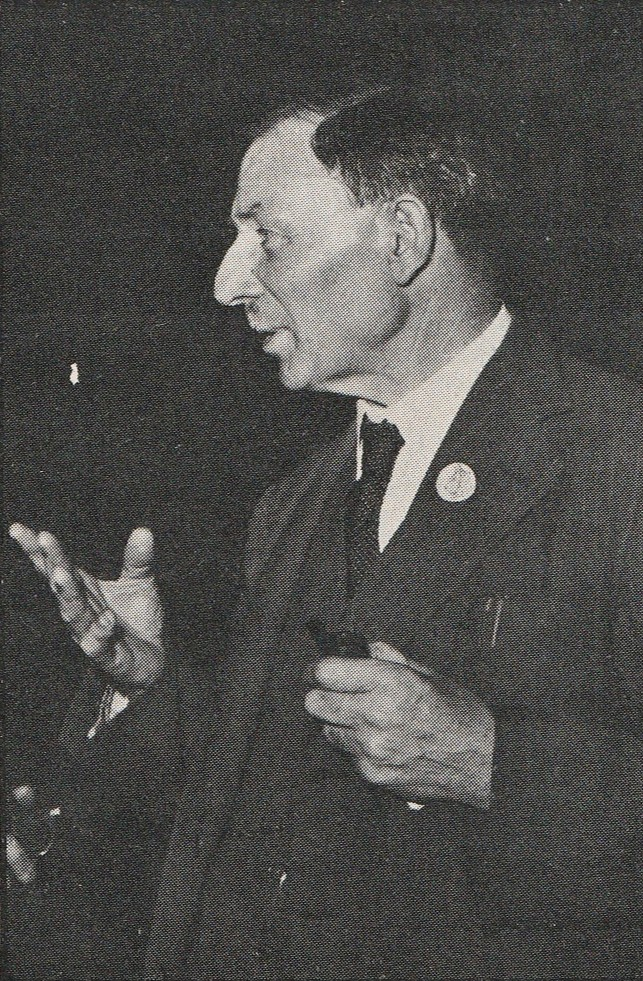
Michael Keyes, c. 1940s

In 1949 he joined the cabinet of John A. Costello replacing the recently deceased Timothy J. Murphy and serving as Minister for Local Government from 1949 to 1951. During the Mother and Child Scheme controversy he urged the government to accept the Catholic Church in Ireland's rebuke of the scheme.

He served in government again between 1954 and 1957, serving as Minister for Posts and Telegraphs. Keyes fought his last election in 1954 and subsequently retired from the Dáil. He also served as Mayor of Limerick from 1928 to 1930, as did his son Christopher P. Keyes from 1957 to 1958, his nephew Frank Leddin (1965–1966 and 1997–1998), his nephew Tim Leddin (1987–1988) and his grandnephew, Joe Leddin (2006–2007). Tim Leddin's wife, Kathleen Leddin also served as mayor from 2013 to 2014 and their son, Keyes' grandnephew, Brian Leddin was Green Party TD for Limerick City from 2020 to 2024.

Civic offices
Preceded by John George O'Brien	Mayor of Limerick; 1928–1930	Succeeded by Patrick Donnellan
Trade union offices
Preceded by Michael Colgan	President of the Irish Trades Union Congress; 1943	Succeeded by Robert Getgood
Political offices
Preceded by William Norton	Minister for Local Government; 1949–1951	Succeeded by Paddy Smith
Preceded by Erskine H. Childers	Minister for Posts and Telegraphs; 1954–1957	Succeeded by Neil Blaney

Dáil	Election	Deputy (Party)	Deputy (Party)	Deputy (Party)	Deputy (Party)	Deputy (Party)	Deputy (Party)	Deputy (Party)
4th	1923	Richard Hayes (CnaG)	James Ledden (CnaG)	Seán Carroll (Rep)	James Colbert (Rep)	John Nolan (CnaG)	Patrick Clancy (Lab)	Patrick Hogan (FP)
4th	1924 by-election	Richard O'Connell (CnaG)	James Ledden (CnaG)	Seán Carroll (Rep)	James Colbert (Rep)	John Nolan (CnaG)	Patrick Clancy (Lab)	Patrick Hogan (FP)
5th	1927 (Jun)	Richard O'Connell (CnaG)	Gilbert Hewson (Ind.)	Tadhg Crowley (FF)	James Colbert (FF)	George C. Bennett (CnaG)	Patrick Clancy (Lab)	Michael Keyes (Lab)
6th	1927 (Sep)	Richard O'Connell (CnaG)	Daniel Bourke (FF)	Tadhg Crowley (FF)	James Colbert (FF)	George C. Bennett (CnaG)	Patrick Clancy (Lab)	John Nolan (CnaG)
7th	1932	James Reidy (CnaG)	Daniel Bourke (FF)	Tadhg Crowley (FF)	James Colbert (FF)	George C. Bennett (CnaG)	Robert Ryan (FF)	John O'Shaughnessy (FP)
8th	1933	James Reidy (CnaG)	Daniel Bourke (FF)	Tadhg Crowley (FF)	Donnchadh Ó Briain (FF)	George C. Bennett (CnaG)	Robert Ryan (FF)	Michael Keyes (Lab)
9th	1937	John O'Shaughnessy (FG)	Daniel Bourke (FF)	Michael Colbert (FF)	Donnchadh Ó Briain (FF)	George C. Bennett (FG)	Robert Ryan (FF)	Michael Keyes (Lab)
10th	1938	James Reidy (FG)	Daniel Bourke (FF)	Tadhg Crowley (FF)	Donnchadh Ó Briain (FF)	George C. Bennett (FG)	Robert Ryan (FF)	Michael Keyes (Lab)
11th	1943	James Reidy (FG)	Daniel Bourke (FF)	Tadhg Crowley (FF)	Donnchadh Ó Briain (FF)	George C. Bennett (FG)	Robert Ryan (FF)	Michael Keyes (Lab)
12th	1944	James Reidy (FG)	Daniel Bourke (FF)	Michael Colbert (FF)	Donnchadh Ó Briain (FF)	George C. Bennett (FG)	Robert Ryan (FF)	Michael Keyes (Lab)
13th	1948	Constituency abolished. See Limerick East and Limerick West						

Dáil	Election	Deputy (Party)	Deputy (Party)	Deputy (Party)
31st	2011	Niall Collins (FF)	Dan Neville (FG)	Patrick O'Donovan (FG)
32nd	2016	Constituency abolished. See Limerick County		

Dáil	Election	Deputy (Party)	Deputy (Party)	Deputy (Party)	Deputy (Party)	Deputy (Party)
13th	1948	Michael Keyes (Lab)	Robert Ryan (FF)	James Reidy (FG)	Daniel Bourke (FF)	4 seats 1948–1981
14th	1951	Michael Keyes (Lab)	Tadhg Crowley (FF)	James Reidy (FG)	Daniel Bourke (FF)	4 seats 1948–1981
14th	1952 by-election	Michael Keyes (Lab)	Tadhg Crowley (FF)	James Reidy (FG)	John Carew (FG)	4 seats 1948–1981
15th	1954	Michael Keyes (Lab)	Tadhg Crowley (FF)	Donogh O'Malley (FF)	John Carew (FG)	4 seats 1948–1981
16th	1957	Ted Russell (Ind.)	Paddy Clohessy (FF)	Donogh O'Malley (FF)	John Carew (FG)	4 seats 1948–1981
17th	1961	Stephen Coughlan (Lab)	Paddy Clohessy (FF)	Donogh O'Malley (FF)	Tom O'Donnell (FG)	4 seats 1948–1981
18th	1965	Stephen Coughlan (Lab)	Paddy Clohessy (FF)	Donogh O'Malley (FF)	Tom O'Donnell (FG)	4 seats 1948–1981
18th	1968 by-election	Stephen Coughlan (Lab)	Paddy Clohessy (FF)	Desmond O'Malley (FF)	Tom O'Donnell (FG)	4 seats 1948–1981
19th	1969	Stephen Coughlan (Lab)	Michael Herbert (FF)	Desmond O'Malley (FF)	Tom O'Donnell (FG)	4 seats 1948–1981
20th	1973	Stephen Coughlan (Lab)	Michael Herbert (FF)	Desmond O'Malley (FF)	Tom O'Donnell (FG)	4 seats 1948–1981
21st	1977	Michael Lipper (Ind.)	Michael Herbert (FF)	Desmond O'Malley (FF)	Tom O'Donnell (FG)	4 seats 1948–1981
22nd	1981	Jim Kemmy (Ind.)	Peadar Clohessy (FF)	Desmond O'Malley (FF)	Tom O'Donnell (FG)	Michael Noonan (FG)
23rd	1982 (Feb)	Jim Kemmy (DSP)	Willie O'Dea (FF)	Desmond O'Malley (FF)	Tom O'Donnell (FG)	Michael Noonan (FG)
24th	1982 (Nov)	Frank Prendergast (Lab)	Willie O'Dea (FF)	Desmond O'Malley (FF)	Tom O'Donnell (FG)	Michael Noonan (FG)
25th	1987	Jim Kemmy (DSP)	Willie O'Dea (FF)	Desmond O'Malley (PDs)	Peadar Clohessy (PDs)	Michael Noonan (FG)
26th	1989	Jim Kemmy (DSP)	Willie O'Dea (FF)	Desmond O'Malley (PDs)	Peadar Clohessy (PDs)	Michael Noonan (FG)
27th	1992	Jim Kemmy (Lab)	Willie O'Dea (FF)	Desmond O'Malley (PDs)	Peadar Clohessy (PDs)	Michael Noonan (FG)
28th	1997	Jim Kemmy (Lab)	Willie O'Dea (FF)	Desmond O'Malley (PDs)	Eddie Wade (FF)	Michael Noonan (FG)
28th	1998 by-election	Jan O'Sullivan (Lab)	Willie O'Dea (FF)	Desmond O'Malley (PDs)	Eddie Wade (FF)	Michael Noonan (FG)
29th	2002	Jan O'Sullivan (Lab)	Willie O'Dea (FF)	Tim O'Malley (PDs)	Peter Power (FF)	Michael Noonan (FG)
30th	2007	Jan O'Sullivan (Lab)	Willie O'Dea (FF)	Kieran O'Donnell (FG)	Peter Power (FF)	Michael Noonan (FG)
31st	2011	Constituency abolished. See Limerick City and Limerick				
