= George C. Bennett (Irish politician) =

Irish politician (1877–1963)

- Thomas Westropp Bennett and George C. Bennett (right), c.1928

Senator
- In office 21 April 1948 – 14 August 1951
- Constituency: Nominated by the Taoiseach

Teachta Dála
- In office June 1927 – February 1948
- Constituency: Limerick

Personal details
- Born: 1877 Limerick, Ireland
- Died: 20 June 1963 (aged 85–86) Limerick, Ireland
- Party: Fine Gael; Cumann na nGaedheal
- Relatives: Thomas Westropp Bennett (brother)

George Cecil Westropp Bennett (1877 – 20 June 1963) was an Irish Cumann na nGaedheal and Fine Gael politician from 1927 to 1951.

== Biography ==
He was born in Ballymurphy, his father's estate in County Limerick in 1877. He was the second son of Captain Thomas Westropp Bennett, a British Army officer. His elder brother Thomas Westropp Bennett was a Senator and Cathaoirleach of the Irish Free State Senate as well as serving in the Board of the Irish Agricultural Organisation Society (IAOS) for many years with Sir Horace Plunkett.

Bennett spent several years farming in Saskatchewan, Canada before returning to Limerick. He became a magistrate, county councillor and vice-chairman of the local hospital committee and was involved in many other charitable projects. A farmer, he was elected to Dáil Éireann as a Cumann na nGaedheal Teachta Dála (TD) at the June 1927 general election for the Limerick constituency. He later joined Fine Gael.

Throughout his time in the Dáil he was renowned as a strong defender of the Agricultural interest. From 1931 he sat on the Public Accounts Committee. After a redrawing of the boundaries of the Limerick constituency he was not re-elected in the 1948 general election but the Inter Party Government Taoiseach John A. Costello nominated him to the Seanad where he sat until 1951.

An agricultural and financial expert, he inherited an estate called Rathaney from his sister Jane Bennett; and owing to his financial independence gave all of his parliamentary salary to funding his constituents. He died in June 1963, and was never married. He was an huntsman and breeder of blood stock and pedigree dogs; the Milltown Irish Red Setters are a legacy of his.

His obituary in The Irish Times in 1963 said that he had been "a popular public representative". In an interview in 2008 Liam Cosgrave, said that "in 60 years he never heard a bad word said against Bennett who was held in universally high regard".

== Sources ==
- Based on the Irish Free State Parliamentary Companion 1932.

Dáil	Election	Deputy (Party)	Deputy (Party)	Deputy (Party)	Deputy (Party)	Deputy (Party)	Deputy (Party)	Deputy (Party)
4th	1923	Richard Hayes (CnaG)	James Ledden (CnaG)	Seán Carroll (Rep)	James Colbert (Rep)	John Nolan (CnaG)	Patrick Clancy (Lab)	Patrick Hogan (FP)
4th	1924 by-election	Richard O'Connell (CnaG)	James Ledden (CnaG)	Seán Carroll (Rep)	James Colbert (Rep)	John Nolan (CnaG)	Patrick Clancy (Lab)	Patrick Hogan (FP)
5th	1927 (Jun)	Richard O'Connell (CnaG)	Gilbert Hewson (Ind.)	Tadhg Crowley (FF)	James Colbert (FF)	George C. Bennett (CnaG)	Patrick Clancy (Lab)	Michael Keyes (Lab)
6th	1927 (Sep)	Richard O'Connell (CnaG)	Daniel Bourke (FF)	Tadhg Crowley (FF)	James Colbert (FF)	George C. Bennett (CnaG)	Patrick Clancy (Lab)	John Nolan (CnaG)
7th	1932	James Reidy (CnaG)	Daniel Bourke (FF)	Tadhg Crowley (FF)	James Colbert (FF)	George C. Bennett (CnaG)	Robert Ryan (FF)	John O'Shaughnessy (FP)
8th	1933	James Reidy (CnaG)	Daniel Bourke (FF)	Tadhg Crowley (FF)	Donnchadh Ó Briain (FF)	George C. Bennett (CnaG)	Robert Ryan (FF)	Michael Keyes (Lab)
9th	1937	John O'Shaughnessy (FG)	Daniel Bourke (FF)	Michael Colbert (FF)	Donnchadh Ó Briain (FF)	George C. Bennett (FG)	Robert Ryan (FF)	Michael Keyes (Lab)
10th	1938	James Reidy (FG)	Daniel Bourke (FF)	Tadhg Crowley (FF)	Donnchadh Ó Briain (FF)	George C. Bennett (FG)	Robert Ryan (FF)	Michael Keyes (Lab)
11th	1943	James Reidy (FG)	Daniel Bourke (FF)	Tadhg Crowley (FF)	Donnchadh Ó Briain (FF)	George C. Bennett (FG)	Robert Ryan (FF)	Michael Keyes (Lab)
12th	1944	James Reidy (FG)	Daniel Bourke (FF)	Michael Colbert (FF)	Donnchadh Ó Briain (FF)	George C. Bennett (FG)	Robert Ryan (FF)	Michael Keyes (Lab)
13th	1948	Constituency abolished. See Limerick East and Limerick West						

Dáil	Election	Deputy (Party)	Deputy (Party)	Deputy (Party)
31st	2011	Niall Collins (FF)	Dan Neville (FG)	Patrick O'Donovan (FG)
32nd	2016	Constituency abolished. See Limerick County		
