= Dublin County (Dáil constituency) =

Dáil constituency (1921–1969)

- Former Dáil constituency

Former constituency
- Created: 1921
- Abolished: 1969
- Seats: 6 (1921–1923); 8 (1923–1937); 5 (1937–1948); 3 (1948–1961); 5 (1961–1969)
- Local government area: County Dublin
- Created from: Dublin Pembroke; Dublin Rathmines; North Dublin; South Dublin
- Replaced by: Dublin County North; Dublin County South

Dublin County was a parliamentary constituency represented in Dáil Éireann, the lower house of the Irish parliament or Oireachtas from 1921 to 1969. The method of election was proportional representation by means of the single transferable vote (PR-STV).

== History and boundaries ==
The constituency was created in 1921 by the Government of Ireland Act 1920 as a 6-seat constituency for the Southern Ireland House of Commons and a two-seat constituency for the United Kingdom House of Commons at Westminster, combining the former Westminster constituencies of Dublin Pembroke, Dublin Rathmines, North Dublin and South Dublin. At the 1921 election for the Southern Ireland House of Commons, the four seats were won uncontested by Sinn Féin, who treated it as part of the election to the Second Dáil. It was never used as a Westminster constituency; under s. 1(4) of the Irish Free State (Agreement) Act 1922, no writ was to be issued "for a constituency in Ireland other than a constituency in Northern Ireland". Therefore, no vote was held in County Dublin at the 1922 United Kingdom general election on 15 November 1922, shortly before the Irish Free State left the United Kingdom on 6 December 1922.

It was restructured by the Electoral Act 1923, the first electoral act of the new state, becoming an 8-seat constituency, first used at the 1923 general election to the 4th Dáil. It was revised at subsequent revisions, taking into account changes in the boundary and city, before its abolition at the 1969 general election. It was replaced by Dublin County North and Dublin County South.

Throughout its history the constituency consisted primarily of the area of County Dublin, excluding the area of Dublin city. However, at various points it also included some territory from within the boundaries of Dublin City.

Changes to the Dublin County constituency 1921–1969
Years	TDs	Boundaries	Notes
1921–1923	6	County Dublin	Combining the former divisions of Pembroke, Rathmines, North Dublin and South Dublin
1923–1937	8	County Dublin	
1937–1948	5	County Dublin, and the following townlands or portions of townlands in the County Borough of Dublin: Annefield, Crumlin, Kimmage (parish of Crumlin), Kimmage (parish of Rathfarnham), Larkfield, Newtown Little, Priesthouse, Rathfarnham, Saint Lawrence, Simmonscourt, Stannaway, Terenure and Tonguefield	In 1930, the urban districts of Pembroke and Rathmines and Rathgar were transferred from the county to the city and in 1931, former rural areas were also transferred to the city. The urban districts formed the Dublin Townships constituency.
1937–1948	3	The Beann Eadair ward of the county borough of Dublin; and County Dublin, except the parts in the Dún Laoghaire and Rathdown constituency and the portion lying to the east of a line drawn commencing at the point on the boundary of that county where Killester Avenue meets Malahide Road and thence in a south-westerly direction along Malahide Road to the boundary of the county, which was in the Dublin North-East constituency	Howth was transferred from the county to the city in 1942, but remained in the county constituency.
1961–1969	5	County Dublin, except the parts in the Dún Laoghaire and Rathdown constituency; and the part of the Ballyfermot ward in the county borough of Dublin which is not included in the Dublin South-West	Area transferred from Dublin North-East and part of Ballyfermot transferred from the former Dublin South
1969	—	Constituency abolished	Divided into Dublin County North (4 seats) and Dublin County South (3 seats)

== TDs ==
Teachtaí Dála (TDs) for Dublin County 1921–1969
Key to parties: CnaP = Clann na Poblachta; CnaG = Cumann na nGaedheal; FP = Farmers' Party; FF = Fianna Fáil; FG = Fine Gael; Ind = Independent; Lab = Labour; Rep = Republican; SF = Sinn Féin; AT-SF = Sinn Féin (Anti-Treaty); PT-SF = Sinn Féin (Pro-Treaty)
Dáil	Election	Deputy (Party)	Deputy (Party)	Deputy (Party)	Deputy (Party)	Deputy (Party)	Deputy (Party)	Deputy (Party)	Deputy (Party)
2nd	1921	Michael Derham (SF)	George Gavan Duffy (SF)	Séamus Dwyer (SF)	Desmond FitzGerald (SF)	Frank Lawless (SF)	Margaret Pearse (SF)	6 seats 1921–1923	
3rd	1922	Michael Derham (PT-SF)	George Gavan Duffy (PT-SF)	Thomas Johnson (Lab)	Desmond FitzGerald (PT-SF)	Darrell Figgis (Ind)	John Rooney (FP)	6 seats 1921–1923	
4th	1923	Michael Derham (CnaG)	Bryan Cooper (Ind)	Thomas Johnson (Lab)	Desmond FitzGerald (CnaG)	Darrell Figgis (Ind)	John Good (Ind)	Kathleen Lynn (Rep)	Kevin O'Higgins (CnaG)
4th	1924 by-election	Batt O'Connor (CnaG)	Bryan Cooper (Ind)	Thomas Johnson (Lab)	Desmond FitzGerald (CnaG)	Darrell Figgis (Ind)	John Good (Ind)	Kathleen Lynn (Rep)	Kevin O'Higgins (CnaG)
4th	1926 by-election	Batt O'Connor (CnaG)	Bryan Cooper (Ind)	Thomas Johnson (Lab)	Desmond FitzGerald (CnaG)	William Norton (Lab)	John Good (Ind)	Kathleen Lynn (Rep)	Kevin O'Higgins (CnaG)
5th	1927 (Jun)	Batt O'Connor (CnaG)	Bryan Cooper (Ind)	Thomas Johnson (Lab)	Desmond FitzGerald (CnaG)	Patrick Belton (FF)	John Good (Ind)	Seán MacEntee (FF)	Kevin O'Higgins (CnaG)
5th	1927 by-election	Batt O'Connor (CnaG)	Bryan Cooper (Ind)	Thomas Johnson (Lab)	Desmond FitzGerald (CnaG)	Patrick Belton (FF)	John Good (Ind)	Seán MacEntee (FF)	Gearóid O'Sullivan (CnaG)
6th	1927 (Sep)	Batt O'Connor (CnaG)	Bryan Cooper (CnaG)	Joseph Murphy (Ind)	Desmond FitzGerald (CnaG)	Seán Brady (FF)	John Good (Ind)	Seán MacEntee (FF)	Gearóid O'Sullivan (CnaG)
6th	1930 by-election	Batt O'Connor (CnaG)	Thomas Finlay (CnaG)	Joseph Murphy (Ind)	Desmond FitzGerald (CnaG)	Seán Brady (FF)	John Good (Ind)	Seán MacEntee (FF)	Gearóid O'Sullivan (CnaG)
7th	1932	Batt O'Connor (CnaG)	Thomas Finlay (CnaG)	Patrick Curran (Lab)	Henry Dockrell (CnaG)	Seán Brady (FF)	John Good (Ind)	Seán MacEntee (FF)	Gearóid O'Sullivan (CnaG)
8th	1933	Batt O'Connor (CnaG)	John A. Costello (CnaG)	Margaret Mary Pearse (FF)	Henry Dockrell (CnaG)	Seán Brady (FF)	John Good (Ind)	Seán MacEntee (FF)	Gearóid O'Sullivan (CnaG)
8th	1935 by-election	Cecil Lavery (FG)	John A. Costello (CnaG)	Margaret Mary Pearse (FF)	Henry Dockrell (CnaG)	Seán Brady (FF)	John Good (Ind)	Seán MacEntee (FF)	Gearóid O'Sullivan (CnaG)
9th	1937	Cecil Lavery (FG)	Henry Dockrell (FG)	Gerrard McGowan (Lab)	Patrick Fogarty (FF)	Seán Brady (FF)	5 seats 1937–1948		
10th	1938	Patrick Belton (FG)	Henry Dockrell (FG)	Thomas Mullen (FF)	Patrick Fogarty (FF)	Seán Brady (FF)	5 seats 1937–1948		
11th	1943	Liam Cosgrave (FG)	Henry Dockrell (FG)	James Tunney (Lab)	Patrick Fogarty (FF)	Seán Brady (FF)	5 seats 1937–1948		
12th	1944	Liam Cosgrave (FG)	Henry Dockrell (FG)	Patrick Burke (FF)	Patrick Fogarty (FF)	Seán Brady (FF)	5 seats 1937–1948		
12th	1947 by-election	Liam Cosgrave (FG)	Henry Dockrell (FG)	Patrick Burke (FF)	Seán MacBride (CnaP)	Seán Brady (FF)	5 seats 1937–1948		
13th	1948	Éamon Rooney (FG)	Seán Dunne (Lab)	Patrick Burke (FF)	3 seats 1948–1961				
14th	1951	Éamon Rooney (FG)	Seán Dunne (Lab)	Patrick Burke (FF)	3 seats 1948–1961				
15th	1954	Éamon Rooney (FG)	Seán Dunne (Lab)	Patrick Burke (FF)	3 seats 1948–1961				
16th	1957	Éamon Rooney (FG)	Kevin Boland (FF)	Patrick Burke (FF)	3 seats 1948–1961				
17th	1961	Éamon Rooney (FG)	Kevin Boland (FF)	Patrick Burke (FF)	Mark Clinton (FG)	Seán Dunne (Ind)	5 seats 1961–1969		
18th	1965	Des Foley (FF)	Kevin Boland (FF)	Patrick Burke (FF)	Mark Clinton (FG)	Seán Dunne (Lab)	5 seats 1961–1969		
19th	1969	Constituency abolished. See Dublin County North and Dublin County South							

Note: The columns in this table are used only for presentational purposes, and no significance should be attached to the order of columns. For details of the order in which seats were won at each election, see the detailed results of that election.

== Elections ==
*: Outgoing TD

=== 1965 general election ===
1965 general election: Dublin County
Party	Candidate	FPv%	Count					
Party	Candidate	FPv%	1	2	3	4	5	6
Fianna Fáil	Patrick Burke	20.9	9,737					
Fianna Fáil	Kevin Boland	19.7	9,183					
Labour	Seán Dunne	14.9	6,953	7,125	7,198	8,558		
Fine Gael	Mark Clinton	12.6	5,872	5,953	6,032	6,124	7,396	7,525
Fine Gael	Éamon Rooney	8.5	3,951	4,016	4,030	4,093	5,476	5,566
Fianna Fáil	Des Foley	7.2	3,367	4,426	5,279	5,381	5,477	8,709
Fine Gael	James McMahon	6.2	2,876	2,899	2,919	3,010		
Fianna Fáil	Seán Walsh	6.1	2,858	3,391	3,757	3,816	3,892	
Labour	Michael Gannon	3.8	1,763	1,806	1,823			
Electorate: 73,571 Valid: 46,560 Quota: 7,761 Turnout: 63.3%

=== 1961 general election ===
1961 general election: Dublin County
Party	Candidate	FPv%	Count						
Party	Candidate	FPv%	1	2	3	4	5	6	7
Fianna Fáil	Patrick Burke	21.9	7,651						
Fianna Fáil	Kevin Boland	21.3	7,438						
Fine Gael	Éamon Rooney	12.5	4,355	4,520	4,563	4,827	5,034	5,872	
Independent	Seán Dunne	10.6	3,711	3,941	4,050	4,109	4,481	4,907	6,086
Fine Gael	Mark Clinton	9.7	3,380	3,499	3,646	4,011	4,067	4,740	5,224
Fianna Fáil	Seán Walsh	5.7	1,989	3,111	4,304	4,349	4,432	4,507	4,793
Fine Gael	James McMahon	5.2	1,831	1,856	1,894	2,262	2,308		
Labour	Michael Gannon	5.1	1,780	1,863	1,894	1,929	2,769	2,939	
Labour	Patrick T. Murphy	4.6	1,596	1,664	1,692	1,730			
Fine Gael	Sidney McCann	3.3	1,162	1,185	1,218				
Electorate: 56,706 Valid: 34,893 Quota: 5,816 Turnout: 61.5%

=== 1957 general election ===
1957 general election: Dublin County
Party	Candidate	FPv%	Count				
Party	Candidate	FPv%	1	2	3	4	5
Fianna Fáil	Patrick Burke	31.5	12,059				
Fianna Fáil	Kevin Boland	24.6	9,412	10,911			
Fine Gael	Éamon Rooney	17.7	6,771	6,948	6,998	9,414	10,055
Labour	Patrick T. Murphy	12.8	4,886	5,006	5,074	5,381	6,241
Fine Gael	Roland Burgess	8.0	3,057	3,143	3,198		
Fianna Fáil	Joseph Larkin	5.4	2,058	2,674	3,851	4,150	
Electorate: 65,305 Valid: 38,243 Quota: 9,561 Turnout: 58.6%

=== 1954 general election ===
1954 general election: Dublin County
Party	Candidate	FPv%	Count		
Party	Candidate	FPv%	1	2	3
Fianna Fáil	Patrick Burke	25.9	10,221		
Labour	Seán Dunne	23.5	9,290	9,714	11,548
Fine Gael	Éamon Rooney	21.6	8,533	11,991	
Fianna Fáil	Kevin Boland	18.3	7,238	7,499	7,779
Fine Gael	Roland Burgess	10.7	4,223		
Electorate: 57,619 Valid: 39,505 Quota: 9,877 Turnout: 68.6%

=== 1951 general election ===
1951 general election: Dublin County
Party	Candidate	FPv%	Count				
Party	Candidate	FPv%	1	2	3	4	5
Fianna Fáil	Patrick Burke	23.7	7,167	7,177	7,245	7,282	8,444
Labour	Seán Dunne	23.3	7,023	7,066	7,609		
Fine Gael	Éamon Rooney	20.0	6,048	7,040	7,681		
Fianna Fáil	Kevin Boland	19.3	5,821	5,838	5,893	5,924	6,430
Fianna Fáil	David Byrne	5.6	1,700	1,704	1,732	1,792	
Clann na Poblachta	McEllistrum O'Rahilly	4.5	1,350	1,380			
Fine Gael	Richard Williams	3.7	1,102				
Electorate: 43,934 Valid: 30,211 Quota: 7,553 Turnout: 68.8%

=== 1948 general election ===
1948 general election: Dublin County
Party	Candidate	FPv%	Count					
Party	Candidate	FPv%	1	2	3	4	5	6
Fianna Fáil	Patrick Burke	32.0	8,092					
Fine Gael	Éamon Rooney	20.5	5,179	5,239	5,283	5,941	6,075	6,540
Labour	Seán Dunne	15.9	4,029	4,154	4,202	4,233	4,393	5,242
Clann na Poblachta	Christopher McGonagle	14.5	3,662	3,705	4,290	4,311	4,367	4,578
Fianna Fáil	Thomas Watkins	6.6	1,662	1,835	1,849	1,886		
Fianna Fáil	David Byrne	4.7	1,193	2,531	2,549	2,563	3,985	
Fine Gael	John Joseph Sheedy	3.0	765	776	785			
Clann na Poblachta	Laurence J. O'Connor	2.9	726	740				
Electorate: 35,549 Valid: 25,308 Quota: 6,328 Turnout: 71.2%

=== 1947 by-election ===
A by-election was held to fill the seat left vacant by death of the Fianna Fáil TD Patrick Fogarty.

1947 by-election: Dublin County
Party	Candidate	FPv%	Count		
Party	Candidate	FPv%	1	2	3
Fianna Fáil	Thomas Mullins	28.8	16,261	17,399	20,197
Clann na Poblachta	Seán MacBride	28.4	16,062	21,755	29,629
Fine Gael	Éamon Rooney	25.0	14,116	15,361	
Labour	Seán Dunne	17.8	10,067		
Electorate: 105,286 Valid: 56,506 Quota: 28,254 Turnout: 53.7%

=== 1944 general election ===
Full figures of the last nine counts are unavailable. Ó Droighneáin, Lynch, Bennett and FitzGerald all lost their deposits.

1944 general election: Dublin County
Party	Candidate	FPv%	Count									
Party	Candidate	FPv%	1	2	3	4	5	6	7	8	9	10
Fianna Fáil	Seán Brady	22.8	14,493									
Fine Gael	Liam Cosgrave	19.4	12,322									
Fianna Fáil	Patrick Fogarty	13.3	8,455	N/A	N/A	N/A	N/A	N/A	N/A	10,905		
Fine Gael	Henry Morgan Dockrell	10.2	6,488	N/A	N/A	N/A	N/A	N/A	N/A	N/A	N/A	10,698
Independent	Patrick Belton	8.2	5,199									
Fianna Fáil	Michael O'Rourke	7.6	4,798									
Fianna Fáil	Patrick Burke	6.3	3,997	N/A	N/A	N/A	N/A	N/A	N/A	N/A	N/A	11,049
Labour	James Tunney	4.4	2,777									
Fine Gael	Desmond FitzGerald	3.1	1,978									
Labour	Louisa Bennett	2.4	1,509									
Labour	Gilbert Lynch	1.4	885									
Ailtirí na hAiséirghe	Oisín Ó Droighneáin	1.0	607									
Electorate: 99,754 Valid: 63,508 Quota: 10,585 Turnout: 63.7%

=== 1943 general election ===
Full figures for the third to the fourteenth counts are unavailable. Hickey, Costelloe, Ennis, Owens, Bobbett, Roe, O'Farrell and Watkins all lost their deposits.

1943 general election: Dublin County
Party	Candidate	FPv%	Count														
Party	Candidate	FPv%	1	2	3	4	5	6	7	8	9	10	11	12	13	14	15
Fianna Fáil	Seán Brady	22.7	15,299														
Fine Gael	Liam Cosgrave	16.5	11,099	11,160	N/A	N/A	11,392										
Fianna Fáil	Patrick Fogarty	13.0	8,779	11,720													
Fine Gael	Henry Morgan Dockrell	10.2	6,882	6,917	N/A	N/A	N/A	N/A	N/A	N/A	N/A	N/A	N/A	N/A	N/A	N/A	12,496
Independent	Patrick Belton	5.9	3,990	4,049	N/A												
Fianna Fáil	Michael O'Rourke	4.9	3,303	3,892	N/A	N/A	N/A	N/A	N/A	N/A	N/A	N/A	N/A	N/A	N/A	N/A	8,777
Labour	Christopher Hannigan	4.7	3,176	3,213	N/A												
Fianna Fáil	Thomas Watkins	4.4	2,954	3,154	N/A												
Labour	James Tunney	4.4	2,932	2,957	N/A	N/A	N/A	N/A	N/A	N/A	N/A	N/A	N/A	N/A	N/A	N/A	9,306
Labour	J. T. O'Farrell	3.9	2,654	2,693	N/A												
Fine Gael	Patrick Roe	2.7	1,815	1,827	N/A												
Clann na Talmhan	Elizabeth F. Bobbett	1.6	1,108	1,121	N/A												
Labour	Gerard Owens	1.5	1,018	1,033	N/A												
Fine Gael	Mary Ennis	1.4	969	985	N/A												
Independent	William J. Costelloe	1.3	881	910	N/A												
Clann na Talmhan	Patrick J. Hickey	0.7	455	463	N/A												
Electorate: 99,754 Valid: 67,314 Quota: 11,220 Turnout: 67.5%

=== 1938 general election ===
1938 general election: Dublin County
Party	Candidate	FPv%	Count					
Party	Candidate	FPv%	1	2	3	4	5	6
Fianna Fáil	Seán Brady	22.1	13,085					
Fine Gael	Henry Morgan Dockrell	15.0	8,900	8,989	8,989	9,028	9,115	9,774
Fine Gael	Patrick Belton	14.8	8,750	8,794	8,794	8,841	8,900	10,039
Fianna Fáil	Patrick Fogarty	12.9	7,660	9,965				
Fine Gael	Cecil Lavery	12.1	7,185	7,226	7,228	7,305	7,406	8,435
Labour	Martin O'Sullivan	9.4	5,564	5,617	5,618	6,009	6,127	
Fianna Fáil	Thomas Mullen	7.3	4,307	4,629	4,648	5,007	7,677	9,568
Fianna Fáil	Andrew McCarthy	4.4	2,580	2,874	2,937	3,173		
Independent	George Gilmore	2.1	1,224	1,285	1,289			
Electorate: 87,033 Valid: 59,255 Quota: 9,876 Turnout: 68.1%

=== 1937 general election ===
1937 general election: Dublin County
Party	Candidate	FPv%	Count								
Party	Candidate	FPv%	1	2	3	4	5	6	7	8	9
Fianna Fáil	Seán Brady	19.1	11,096								
Fine Gael	Henry Morgan Dockrell	18.7	10,828								
Labour	Gerrard McGowan	11.1	6,412	6,454	6,465	6,672	6,792	6,962	7,111	7,633	9,306
Fianna Fáil	Margaret Mary Pearse	10.7	6,204	6,651	6,653	6,743	6,755	6,826	6,857		
Fianna Fáil	Patrick Fogarty	10.4	6,048	6,907	6,913	7,009	7,145	7,193	7,209	12,700	
Independent	Patrick Belton	9.5	5,497	5,519	5,569	5,830	6,236	6,594	7,544	7,874	8,205
Fine Gael	Cecil Lavery	8.0	4,633	4,645	5,196	5,435	6,863	10,808			
Fine Gael	Gearóid O'Sullivan	6.9	3,991	3,999	4,100	4,221	4,700				
Fine Gael	James Ennis	3.5	2,002	2,015	2,440	2,633					
Independent	John Corr	2.2	1,255	1,286	1,306						
Electorate: 83,457 Valid: 57,966 Quota: 9,662 Turnout: 69.5%

=== 1935 by-election ===
A by-election was held to fill the seat left vacant by death of the Fine Gael TD Batt O'Connor.

1935 by-election: Dublin County
Party	Candidate	FPv%	Count
Party	Candidate	FPv%	1
Fine Gael	Cecil Lavery	57.2	43,671
Fianna Fáil	Thomas Mullen	42.8	32,656
Electorate: 128,239 Valid: 76,327 Quota: 38,164 Turnout: 59.5%

=== 1933 general election ===
1933 general election: Dublin County
Party	Candidate	FPv%	Count												
Party	Candidate	FPv%	1	2	3	4	5	6	7	8	9	10	11	12	13
Fianna Fáil	Seán MacEntee	17.3	15,644												
Cumann na nGaedheal	Henry Morgan Dockrell	12.9	11,710												
Cumann na nGaedheal	John A. Costello	12.1	10,941												
Fianna Fáil	Seán Brady	11.7	10,626												
Independent	John Good	9.9	8,916	8,937	9,458	9,525	9,532	9,565	10,145						
Cumann na nGaedheal	Gearóid O'Sullivan	7.8	7,030	7,057	7,287	7,428	7,431	7,469	7,926	7,940	8,133	9,439	11,126		
Cumann na nGaedheal	Batt O'Connor	6.4	5,816	5,849	6,147	6,326	6,330	6,384	6,762	6,787	7,195	9,379	12,609		
Cumann na nGaedheal	John P. O'Connor	4.3	3,898	3,915	4,052	4,109	4,112	4,132	4,330	4,341	4,498				
Fianna Fáil	Margaret Mary Pearse	4.3	3,876	6,442	6,444	6,445	6,606	6,698	6,812	6,813	7,933	8,023	8,078	8,164	8,199
Labour	Patrick Curran	3.6	3,227	3,429	3,437	3,469	3,539	4,139	4,244	4,248					
National Centre Party	James Rooney	3.1	2,833	2,856	2,870	2,882	2,885	2,901							
Fianna Fáil	Thomas Mullen	2.8	2,520	5,142	5,144	5,146	5,451	5,557	5,627	5,628	7,126	7,179	7,299	7,370	7,409
Cumann na nGaedheal	James Ennis	2.8	2,491	2,506	2,950	3,346	3,354	3,381	4,310	4,348	4,738	5,445			
Labour	Archie Heron	1.0	924	991	994	997	1,008								
Electorate: 117,807 Valid: 90,452 Quota: 10,051 Turnout: 76.8%

=== 1932 general election ===
1932 general election: Dublin County
Party	Candidate	FPv%	Count															
Party	Candidate	FPv%	1	2	3	4	5	6	7	8	9	10	11	12	13	14	15	16
Cumann na nGaedheal	Henry Morgan Dockrell	14.0	11,332															
Fianna Fáil	Seán MacEntee	13.0	10,496															
Cumann na nGaedheal	Thomas Finlay	11.3	9,096															
Fianna Fáil	Seán Brady	10.4	8,386	8,392	9,236													
Independent	John Good	8.7	7,048	7,571	7,578	7,589	7,590	7,597	7,610	7,645	7,744	7,859	8,759	8,804	9,482			
Cumann na nGaedheal	Batt O'Connor	8.4	6,804	7,115	7,141	7,184	7,186	7,201	7,239	7,284	8,359	8,671	9,312					
Cumann na nGaedheal	Gearóid O'Sullivan	5.8	4,668	4,857	4,862	4,891	4,892	4,909	4,985	4,998	5,383	5,488	5,765	5,922	6,304	6,432	7,618	8,136
Independent	William Crawford	4.0	3,194	3,336	3,344	3,347	3,348	3,358	3,419	3,428	3,502	3,590	3,790	3,805	4,142	4,275		
Labour	Patrick Curran	3.4	2,768	2,774	2,794	2,795	2,800	2,813	3,198	3,294	3,323	4,714	4,876	4,891	5,372	5,397	5,963	7,609
Independent	John P. Cuffe	3.2	2,607	2,640	2,654	2,657	2,661	2,689	2,733	2,800	2,872	3,055	3,431	3,462				
Independent	Joseph Murphy	3.2	2,548	2,632	2,661	2,668	2,669	2,686	2,737	2,760	2,905	3,055						
Cumann na nGaedheal	John P. O'Connor	2.9	2,308	2,426	2,435	2,445	2,448	2,472	2,500	2,519								
Fianna Fáil	Pádraic Ó Máille	2.7	2,195	2,196	2,497	2,498	2,595	3,175	3,230	4,364	4,444	4,603	4,737	4,782	5,078	5,115	5,313	
Labour	John M. Devitt	2.6	2,093	2,102	2,117	2,118	2,121	2,144	2,587	2,622	2,861							
Cumann na nGaedheal	James Ennis	2.3	1,881	2,799	2,804	2,825	2,826	2,839	2,850	2,945	3,200	3,357	3,540	3,579	4,310	4,408	5,666	5,893
Fianna Fáil	Richard Duke	1.6	1,262	1,285	1,385	1,385	1,474	1,659	1,694									
Labour	Robert Tynan	1.5	1,242	1,244	1,253	1,253	1,253	1,263										
Fianna Fáil	Thomas O'Donnell	0.9	756	758	897	898	961											
Electorate: 115,156 Valid: 80,684 Quota: 8,965 Turnout: 70.1%

=== 1930 by-election ===
A by-election was held on 9 December 1930 to fill the seat in the 6th Dáil which had been left vacant by the death of Cumann na nGaedheal TD Bryan Cooper.

1930 by-election: Dublin County
Party	Candidate	FPv%	Count
Party	Candidate	FPv%	1
Cumann na nGaedheal	Thomas Finlay	70.2	35,362
Fianna Fáil	Conor Maguire	29.8	15,024
Electorate: 113,260 Valid: 50,386 Quota: 25,194 Turnout: 44.5%

=== September 1927 general election ===
September 1927 general election: Dublin County
Party	Candidate	FPv%	Count									
Party	Candidate	FPv%	1	2	3	4	5	6	7	8	9	10
Cumann na nGaedheal	Bryan Cooper	21.4	15,462									
Cumann na nGaedheal	Gearóid O'Sullivan	14.3	10,343									
Cumann na nGaedheal	Desmond FitzGerald	12.8	9,227									
Fianna Fáil	Seán MacEntee	8.3	5,954	5,971	5,983	5,993	6,614	7,878	9,147			
Fianna Fáil	Seán Brady	7.8	5,658	5,665	5,676	5,679	6,035	8,056				
Independent	Joseph Murphy	5.8	4,207	4,880	5,037	5,102	5,253	5,302	5,918	6,158	6,498	7,470
Independent	Patrick Belton	5.4	3,922	3,970	4,032	4,052	4,369	4,580	5,446	5,841	6,071	6,239
Independent	John Good	5.1	3,679	6,291	6,408	6,487	6,527	6,580	6,857	6,885	7,182	8,196
Labour	Thomas Johnson	5.0	3,626	3,786	3,858	3,894	4,139	4,286				
Fianna Fáil	Robert Brennan	5.0	3,591	3,611	3,626	3,634	3,892					
Cumann na nGaedheal	Joseph O'Neill	3.3	2,352	3,301	4,109	4,351	4,400	4,415	4,667	4,696		
Irish Worker League	James Larkin Jnr	2.9	2,126	2,163	2,184	2,193						
Cumann na nGaedheal	Batt O'Connor	2.9	2,057	4,973	6,018	6,750	6,805	6,821	7,242	7,284	10,637	
Electorate: 100,840 Valid: 72,204 Quota: 8,023 Turnout: 71.6%

=== 1927 by-election ===
A by-election was held on 14 August 1927 to fill the seat in the 4th Dáil which had been left vacant by the assassination on 10 July of the Minister for Justice, Cumann na nGaedheal TD Kevin O'Higgins.

1927 by-election: Dublin County
Party	Candidate	FPv%	Count
Party	Candidate	FPv%	1
Cumann na nGaedheal	Gearóid O'Sullivan	69.6	39,966
Fianna Fáil	Robert Brennan	28.1	16,126
Sinn Féin	Kathleen Lynn	2.3	1,332
Electorate: 110,840 Valid: 57,424 Quota: 28,713 Turnout: 51.8%

=== June 1927 general election ===
Full figures for counts 5 to 18 are not available. Eight candidates lost their deposits (Tench, Morris, Byrne, Brennan, Guinness, McCabe, Rooney and Lynn).

June 1927 general election: Dublin County
Party	Candidate	FPv%	Count																	
Party	Candidate	FPv%	1	2	3	4	5	6	7	8	9	10	11	12	13	14	15	16	17	18
Cumann na nGaedheal	Kevin O'Higgins	22.7	15,918																	
Independent	Bryan Cooper	13.4	9,378																	
Fianna Fáil	Patrick Belton	12.5	8,751																	
Labour	Thomas Johnson	6.1	4,257	4,539	4,613	4,633	N/A	N/A	N/A	N/A	N/A	N/A	N/A	N/A	N/A	N/A	7,983			
Fianna Fáil	Seán MacEntee	6.1	4,238	4,251	4,254	4,339	N/A	N/A	N/A	N/A	N/A	N/A	N/A	N/A	N/A	N/A	N/A	N/A	N/A	9,370
Independent	John Good	6.0	4,204	4,635	5,732	5,739	N/A	N/A	N/A	N/A	N/A	N/A	N/A	N/A	N/A	N/A	8,152			
Cumann na nGaedheal	Desmond FitzGerald	5.6	3,902	8,754																
Labour	Patrick Curran	4.2	2,926	2,973	3,000	3,033	N/A	N/A	N/A	N/A	N/A	N/A	N/A	N/A	N/A	N/A	N/A	N/A	N/A	4,505
Labour	William Norton	3.5	2,440	2,574	2,594	2,603	N/A	N/A	N/A	N/A	N/A	N/A	N/A	N/A	N/A	N/A	N/A	N/A	N/A	N/A
Sinn Féin	Kathleen Lynn	2.8	1,937	1,954	1,960	1,977	N/A	N/A	N/A	N/A	N/A	N/A	N/A	N/A	N/A	N/A	N/A	N/A	N/A	N/A
National League	Henry Harrison	2.7	1,919	1,982	2,082	2,086	N/A	N/A	N/A	N/A	N/A	N/A	N/A	N/A	N/A	N/A	N/A	N/A	N/A	N/A
Fianna Fáil	Seán Brady	2.3	1,636	1,647	1,652	2,337	N/A	N/A	N/A	N/A	N/A	N/A	N/A	N/A	N/A	N/A	N/A	N/A	N/A	N/A
National League	John McCabe	2.3	1,610	1,683	1,706	1,711	N/A	N/A	N/A	N/A	N/A	N/A	N/A	N/A	N/A	N/A	N/A	N/A	N/A	N/A
Cumann na nGaedheal	Batt O'Connor	2.3	1,602	3,070	3,134	3,136	N/A	N/A	N/A	N/A	N/A	N/A	N/A	N/A	N/A	N/A	N/A	N/A	N/A	6,505
Independent	Mary Guinness	2.0	1,413	1,556	1,675	1,684	N/A	N/A	N/A	N/A	N/A	N/A	N/A	N/A	N/A	N/A	N/A	N/A	N/A	N/A
Cumann na nGaedheal	John Rooney	1.8	1,263	1,801	1,826	1,833	N/A	N/A	N/A	N/A	N/A	N/A	N/A	N/A	N/A	N/A	N/A	N/A	N/A	N/A
Fianna Fáil	Robert Brennan	1.4	1,009	1,016	1,019	1,075	N/A	N/A	N/A	N/A	N/A	N/A	N/A	N/A	N/A	N/A	N/A	N/A	N/A	N/A
Independent	Denis Byrne	1.4	994	1,017	1,030	1,038	N/A	N/A	N/A	N/A	N/A	N/A	N/A	N/A	N/A	N/A	N/A	N/A	N/A	N/A
Fianna Fáil	James F. Morris	0.5	378	382	383	396	N/A	N/A	N/A	N/A	N/A	N/A	N/A	N/A	N/A	N/A	N/A	N/A	N/A	N/A
National League	Gerald Tench	0.5	315	339	349	352	N/A	N/A	N/A	N/A	N/A	N/A	N/A	N/A	N/A	N/A	N/A	N/A	N/A	N/A
Electorate: 110,480 Valid: 70,090 Quota: 7,788 Turnout: 63.2%

=== 1926 by-election ===
A by-election was held on 18 February 1926 to fill the seat in the 4th Dáil which had been vacated by the death of the Independent TD Darrell Figgis. It was won by the Labour Party candidate William Norton. Norton's win was the first by a Labour Party candidate at a by-election since the establishment of the First Dáil. Labour would next win a seat from another party in a by-election at the 1976 Dublin South-West by-election.

1926 by-election: Dublin County
Party	Candidate	FPv%	Count	
Party	Candidate	FPv%	1	2
Cumann na nGaedheal	Thomas Healy	37.2	12,279	14,303
Labour	William Norton	35.7	11,797	15,168
Independent	Patrick Belton	27.2	8,974	
Electorate: 98,187 Valid: 33,050 Quota: 16,526 Turnout: 33.7%

=== 1924 by-election ===
A by-election was held on 19 March 1924 to fill the seat in the 4th Dáil which had been left vacant by the death of the Cumann na nGaedheal TD Michael Derham.

1924 by-election: Dublin County
Party	Candidate	FPv%	Count		
Party	Candidate	FPv%	1	2	3
Cumann na nGaedheal	Batt O'Connor	39.0	16,456	18,353	24,491
Republican	Seán MacEntee	24.3	10,263	11,760	12,679
Businessmen's Party	Matthew Good	21.7	9,158	9,705	
Labour	Archie Heron	14.9	6,287		
Electorate: 98,187 Valid: 42,164 Quota: 21,083 Turnout: 42.9%

=== 1923 general election ===
1923 general election: Dublin County
Party	Candidate	FPv%	Count																
Party	Candidate	FPv%	1	2	3	4	5	6	7	8	9	10	11	12	13	14	15	16	17
Cumann na nGaedheal	Kevin O'Higgins	36.3	20,821																
Independent	Bryan Cooper	7.2	4,128	4,585	4,779	4,781	4,785	4,940	4,978	4,993	5,018	5,107	5,155	5,160	5,286	5,300	5,314	5,440	6,369
Labour	Thomas Johnson	6.8	3,911	4,253	4,345	4,371	4,409	4,415	4,529	5,110	5,155	5,293	5,359	5,421	5,591	5,611	5,753	6,399	
Cumann na nGaedheal	Desmond FitzGerald	6.3	3,615	12,180															
Businessmen's Party	John Good	5.6	3,238	3,642	3,829	3,832	3,841	3,912	3,958	3,963	4,008	4,078	4,115	4,123	4,287	4,303	4,315	4,387	6,896
Republican	Kathleen Lynn	5.3	3,064	3,085	3,086	3,180	3,183	3,190	3,241	3,304	3,318	3,357	3,372	4,267	4,313	4,316	7,532		
Independent	Darrell Figgis	5.1	2,923	3,563	3,952	3,955	3,972	4,030	4,296	4,353	4,442	4,633	4,752	4,779	5,151	5,214	5,271	5,455	5,673
Independent	David Barry	4.4	2,539	2,913	3,086	3,088	3,096	3,416	3,441	3,447	3,480	3,533	3,559	3,567	3,820	3,852	3,863	3,943	
Republican	Seán MacEntee	4.1	2,350	2,372	2,374	2,513	2,515	2,515	2,545	2,568	2,571	2,625	2,643	3,664	3,714	3,719			
Cumann na nGaedheal	Michael Derham	3.5	1,986	2,731	4,836	4,843	5,033	5,058	5,118	5,172	5,329	5,464	5,978	6,001	6,646				
Republican	Conn Murphy	3.3	1,905	1,925	1,931	2,060	2,067	2,069	2,094	2,119	2,129	2,178	2,189						
Farmers' Party	John Rooney	2.7	1,530	1,768	1,826	1,848	1,852	1,858	1,880	1,894	2,331	2,430	2,526	2,557					
Independent	John P. McCabe	1.4	815	1,020	1,087	1,093	1,104	1,116	1,158	1,198	1,225								
Labour	Bernard Kavanagh	1.4	810	898	924	933	939	944	990										
Farmers' Party	John Fitzsimons	1.2	676	1,019	1,072	1,076	1,085	1,096	1,118	1,128									
Independent	James Ashe	1.2	663	708	728	728	728												
Cumann na nGaedheal	Batt O'Connor	1.2	658	1,517	2,920	2,924	3,187	3,198	3,239	3,265	3,368	3,452	4,485	4,530	4,745	4,864	4,948	4,998	5,057
Independent	George Gavan Duffy	1.1	653	812	876	882	896	912											
Republican	Philip Ryan	0.8	466	474	475														
Cumann na nGaedheal	Michael W. O'Reilly	0.8	459	1,233	1,801	1,811	1,894	1,898	1,922	1,947	2,021	2,125							
Cumann na nGaedheal	Seán B. Healy	0.3	153	291	688	688													
Electorate: 97,167 Valid: 57,363 Quota: 6,374 Turnout: 59.0%

=== 1922 general election ===
1922 general election: Dublin County
Party	Candidate	FPv%	Count								
Party	Candidate	FPv%	1	2	3	4	5	6	7	8	9
Independent	Darrell Figgis	29.0	15,087								
Labour	Thomas Johnson	15.9	8,220								
Sinn Féin (Pro-Treaty)	George Gavan Duffy	13.3	6,918	8,735							
Sinn Féin (Anti-Treaty)	Margaret Pearse	9.3	4,826	4,859	4,940	4,964	5,093	5,297	5,393	5,529	5,579
Sinn Féin (Pro-Treaty)	Desmond FitzGerald	8.3	4,308	5,413	5,686	6,255	6,544	8,069			
Farmers' Party	John Rooney	7.1	3,697	6,183	6,233	6,476	6,622	6,874	6,953	9,662	
Sinn Féin (Pro-Treaty)	Michael Derham	5.7	2,961	3,118	3,204	3,272	4,283	5,093	5,451	5,945	7,113
Sinn Féin (Pro-Treaty)	Séamus Dwyer	5.0	2,603	2,986	3,067	3,164	3,256				
Sinn Féin (Pro-Treaty)	Peter O'Kelly	3.2	1,644	1,734	1,905	1,974					
Independent	John P. McCabe	3.1	1,613	3,217	3,283	3,536	3,641	3,918	4,042		
Electorate: 79,174 Valid: 51,877 Quota: 7,412 Turnout: 65.5%

=== 1921 general election ===
In the 1921 general election to the Second Dáil, no constituencies were contested.

1921 general election: Dublin County (uncontested)
Party	Candidate
Sinn Féin	Michael Derham
Sinn Féin	George Gavan Duffy
Sinn Féin	Séamus Dwyer
Sinn Féin	Desmond FitzGerald
Sinn Féin	Frank Lawless
Sinn Féin	Margaret Pearse

== See also ==
- Dáil constituencies
- Politics of the Republic of Ireland
- Historic Dáil constituencies
- Elections in the Republic of Ireland
