= North County Dublin =

North County Dublin may refer to:

- Fingal, a county of Ireland, formed in 1994 as one of three successor counties to County Dublin
- Dublin County North, a Dáil constituency created in 1969 and abolished in 1981
- Northside, Dublin, the part of Dublin city north of the River Liffey
