= Dublin County Mid =

Dáil constituency (1977–1981)

- Former Dáil constituency

Former constituency
- Created: 1977
- Abolished: 1981
- Seats: 3
- Local government area: County Dublin
- Created from: Dublin County North; Dublin County South
- Replaced by: Dublin South; Dublin South-West; Dublin South-Central

Dublin County Mid was a parliamentary constituency represented in Dáil Éireann, the lower house of the Irish parliament or Oireachtas from 1977 to 1981. The constituency elected 3 deputies (Teachtaí Dála, commonly known as TDs) to the Dáil, using proportional representation by means of the single transferable vote (PR-STV).

== History ==
The constituency was created under the terms of the Electoral (Amendment) Act 1974 as part of the redistribution of constituencies which attempted to secure the re-election of the outgoing Fine Gael–Labour Party government. It drew its electorate from the existing Dublin County North and Dublin County South constituencies.

It was abolished by the Electoral (Amendment) Act 1980 and divided between the constituencies of Dublin South, Dublin South-West and Dublin South-Central. It was only used for the 1977 general election to the 21st Dáil.

== Boundaries ==
The constituency covered the Rathfarnham, Terenure and Tallaght areas of County Dublin, as well as Blessington and other areas of northern County Wicklow. In the Electoral (Amendment) Act 1974, the boundaries of Dublin County Mid are given as:

In the administrative county of Dublin, the district electoral divisions of:

Rathfarnham Number One, Rathfarnham Number Two, Tallaght Number One, Tallaght Number Two,
Tallaght Number Three, Terenure Number Two, Terenure Number Three, Terenure Number Four, Whitechurch;

and, in the administrative county of Wicklow, the district electoral divisions of:

Blessington, Burgage, Kilbride, Lackan, in the former Rural District of Baltinglass No. 1;

and the following wards in the county borough of Dublin:

Rathfarnham B, Rathfarnham C, Rathfarnham D, Rathfarnham South.

== TDs ==
Teachtaí Dála (TDs) for Dublin County Mid 1977–1981
Key to parties: FF = Fianna Fáil; FG = Fine Gael
Dáil	Election	Deputy (Party)	Deputy (Party)	Deputy (Party)
21st	1977	Seán Walsh (FF)	Síle de Valera (FF)	Larry McMahon (FG)
22nd	1981	Constituency abolished		

Note: The columns in this table are used only for presentational purposes, and no significance should be attached to the order of columns. For details of the order in which seats were won at each election, see the detailed results of that election.

== 1977 general election ==
*: Outgoing TD

1977 general election: Dublin County Mid
Party	Candidate	FPv%	Count					
Party	Candidate	FPv%	1	2	3	4	5	6
Fianna Fáil	Seán Walsh	26.8	10,927					
Fine Gael	Larry McMahon	16.2	6,593	6,716	7,729	7,756	9,913	10,118
Labour	Mervyn Taylor	15.8	6,430	7,684	7,975	8,012	8,487	8,727
Fianna Fáil	Síle de Valera	14.6	5,969	5,998	6,031	6,346	6,370	11,461
Fianna Fáil	Richard Conroy	12.9	5,252	5,274	5,297	5,554	5,633	
Fine Gael	Stanley Laing	5.7	2,338	2,380	2,785	2,789		
Fine Gael	Noel Murphy	4.2	1,701	1,786				
Labour	Paul Mulhern	3.8	1,567					
Electorate: 54,945 Quota: 10,195 Turnout: 40,777

== See also ==
- Dáil constituencies
- Politics of the Republic of Ireland
- Historic Dáil constituencies
- Elections in the Republic of Ireland
