= Dublin Rathmines =

Westminster constituency (1918–1922)

- Former county constituency for the House of Commons

1918–1922
- Seats: 1
- Created from: Dublin South
- Replaced by: Dublin County

Rathmines, a division of County Dublin based on the urban district of Rathmines and Rathgar, was a parliamentary constituency in Ireland. It returned one Member of Parliament (MP) to the House of Commons of the Parliament of the United Kingdom from 1918 to 1922.

The only election held in the constituency was at the 1918 general election. Prior to this election, the area was the northern part of the constituency of South Dublin. From 1922 it was not represented in the British Parliament.

== History ==
Dublin Rathmines was created under the Redistribution of Seats (Ireland) Act 1918 following recommendations of the 1917 Boundary Commission, which increased the parliamentary representation of the administrative county of Dublin from two divisions to four.

Before the 1918 general election, Sinn Féin issued an election manifesto in which it called for the "establishment of a constituent assembly comprising persons chosen by Irish constituencies". After the election, Sinn Féin invited all those elected for Irish constituencies to sit as members of Dáil Éireann, termed Teachta Dála (or TD, known in English as a Deputy). In practice, only those elected for Sinn Féin attended. Dublin Rathmines was the only constituency outside Ulster or Dublin University to elect a Unionist MP.

Under the Government of Ireland Act 1920, the area was combined with Dublin Pembroke, North Dublin and South Dublin as a 6-seat constituency for the Southern Ireland House of Commons and a two-seat constituency at Westminster. At the 1921 election for the Southern Ireland House of Commons, the six seats were won uncontested by Sinn Féin, who treated it as part of the election to the Second Dáil.

It was never used again as a Westminster constituency; under s. 1(4) of the Irish Free State (Agreement) Act 1922, no writ was to be issued "for a constituency in Ireland other than a constituency in Northern Ireland". Therefore, no vote was held in Dublin County at the 1922 United Kingdom general election on 15 November 1922, shortly before the Irish Free State left the United Kingdom on 6 December 1922.

== Boundaries ==
Map of the constituency within Dublin County.

The Rathmines Division was defined as:

the urban district of Rathmines and Rathgar, and the part of the rural district of South Dublin which consists of the district electoral division of Terenure.

It extended west into the middle of the county. The constituency was bounded by the city of Dublin to the north, North Dublin to the west, the Pembroke division of County Dublin to the south.

== Members of Parliament ==
Election	Member	Party
1918	Maurice Dockrell	Irish Unionist
1922	constituency abolished	

== Elections ==
General election, 14 December 1918: Dublin County, Rathmines
Party	Candidate	Votes	%	±%
Irish Unionist	Maurice Dockrell	7,400	50.18	
Sinn Féin	Patrick Little	5,566	37.75	
Irish Nationalist	George Aloysius Moonan	1,780	12.07	
Majority		1,834	12.43	
Turnout		14,746	78.27	
Irish Unionist win (new seat)				
