= 1935 Dublin County by-election =

By-election to the 8th Dáil

- 17 June 1935
- Turnout: 76,327 (59.5%)
	Lavery	Mullen
Nominee	Cecil Lavery	Thomas Mullen
Party	Fine Gael	Fianna Fáil
First preferences	37,415	24,088
Percentage	60.8%	39.2%
TD before election
Batt O'Connor
Fine Gael
TD after election
Cecil Lavery
Fine Gael

A Dáil by-election was held in the constituency of Dublin County in the Irish Free State on Monday, 17 June 1935, to fill a vacancy in the 8th Dáil. It followed the death of Fine Gael TD Batt O'Connor on 7 February 1935. In 1935, Dublin County was an eight seat constituency comprising County Dublin.

The writ of election to fill the vacancy was agreed by the Dáil on 29 May 1935. The by-election was won by the Fine Gael candidate Cecil Lavery.

The Fianna Fáil candidate Thomas Mullen was elected for Dublin County at the 1938 general election.

== Result ==
1935 Dublin County by-election
Party	Candidate	FPv%	Count
Party	Candidate	FPv%	1
Fine Gael	Cecil Lavery	57.2	43,671
Fianna Fáil	Thomas Mullen	42.8	32,656
Electorate: 128,239 Valid: 76,327 Quota: 38,164 Turnout: 59.5%
