= Dublin Pembroke =

Westminster constituency (1918–1922)

- Former county constituency for the House of Commons

1918–1922
- Seats: 1
- Created from: Dublin South
- Replaced by: Dublin County

Pembroke, a division of County Dublin, was a parliamentary county constituency in Ireland. It returned one Member of Parliament (MP) to the House of Commons of the Parliament of the United Kingdom from 1918 to 1922.

Prior to the 1918 United Kingdom general election the area was part of the South Dublin constituency, and extended west into territory formerly part of North Dublin. From 1922, shortly before the establishment of the Irish Free State, it was not represented at Westminster.

== History ==
Dublin Pembroke was created under the Redistribution of Seats (Ireland) Act 1918 following recommendations of the 1917 Boundary Commission, which increased the parliamentary representation of the administrative county of Dublin from two divisions to four. The 1918 general election was used by Sinn Féin as an election to Dáil Éireann. Desmond FitzGerald sat as a member of the First Dáil, abstaining from Westminster.

Under the Government of Ireland Act 1920, the area was combined with Dublin Rathmines, North Dublin and South Dublin as a 6-seat constituency for the Southern Ireland House of Commons and a two-seat constituency at Westminster. At the 1921 election for the Southern Ireland House of Commons, the six seats were won uncontested by Sinn Féin, who treated it as part of the election to the Second Dáil. Desmond FitzGerald was one of the six TDs for Dublin County. It was never used as a Westminster constituency; under s. 1(4) of the Irish Free State (Agreement) Act 1922, no writ was to be issued "for a constituency in Ireland other than a constituency in Northern Ireland". Therefore, no vote was held in Dublin County at the 1922 United Kingdom general election on 15 November 1922, shortly before the Irish Free State left the United Kingdom on 6 December 1922.

== Boundaries ==
The Pembroke Division was defined as:

the urban district of Pembroke, the part of the rural district of Rathdown No. 1 which consists of the district electoral divisions of Dundrum and Milltown, and the part of the rural district of South Dublin which is not included in the North Dublin and Rathmines divisions.

== Members of Parliament ==
Election	Member	Party
1918	Desmond FitzGerald	Sinn Féin
1922	constituency abolished	

== Elections ==
General Election 14 December 1918: Dublin County, Pembroke
Party	Candidate	Votes	%	±%
Sinn Féin	Desmond Fitzgerald	6,114	47.47	
Irish Unionist	John P. Good	4,138	32.12	
Irish Nationalist	Charles Paul O’Neill	2,629	20.41	
Majority		1,976	15.35	
Turnout		12,881	72.78	
Sinn Féin win (new seat)				
