= Joe Fox (politician) =

Irish Fianna Fáil politician (1931–1981)

Teachta Dála
- In office June 1977 – June 1981
- Constituency: Dublin County North

Personal details
- Born: Christopher Joseph Fox; 4 April 1931 County Dublin, Ireland
- Died: 1 October 1981 (aged 50) County Dublin, Ireland
- Party: Fianna Fáil

Christopher Joseph Fox (4 April 1931 – 1 October 1981) was an Irish Fianna Fáil politician. A farmer and auctioneer, Fox was elected to Dáil Éireann as a Fianna Fáil Teachta Dála (TD) for the Dublin County North constituency at the 1977 general election but lost his seat at the 1981 general election.

He was an unsuccessful candidate at the 1979 European Parliament election in the Dublin constituency. He was also a member of Dublin County Council.

Dáil	Election	Deputy (Party)	Deputy (Party)	Deputy (Party)	Deputy (Party)
19th	1969	Patrick Burke (FF)	Des Foley (FF)	Mark Clinton (FG)	Justin Keating (Lab)
20th	1973	Patrick Burke (FF)	Seán Walsh (FF)	Mark Clinton (FG)	Justin Keating (Lab)
21st	1977	Ray Burke (FF)	Joe Fox (FF)	John Boland (FG)	3 seats 1977–1981
22nd	1981	Constituency abolished. See Dublin North			
