= 1947 Dublin County by-election =

By-election to the 12th Dáil

- 29 October 1947
- Turnout: 56,506 (53.7%)
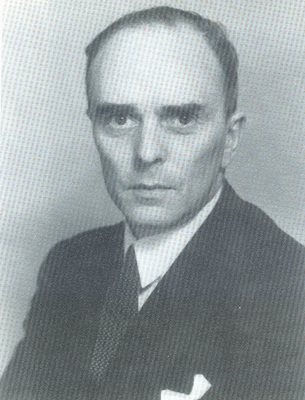

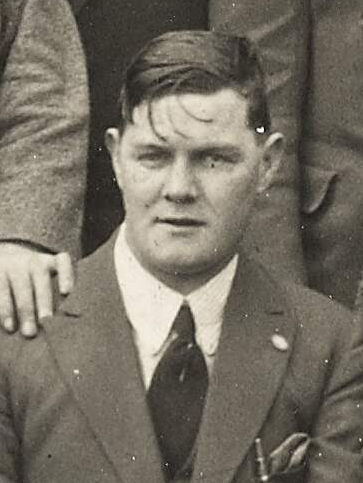

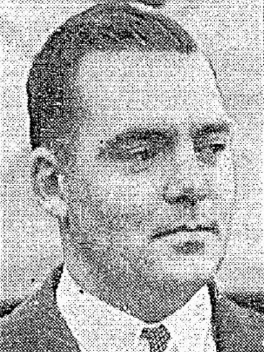
Nominee	Seán MacBride	Thomas Mullins	Éamon Rooney
Party	Clann na Poblachta	Fianna Fáil	Fine Gael
First preferences	16,062	16,261	14,116
Percentage	28.4%	28.8%	25.0%
Final count	29,629	20,197	–
TD before election
Patrick Fogarty
Fianna Fáil
TD after election
Seán MacBride
Clann na Poblachta

A Dáil by-election was held in the constituency of Dublin County in Ireland on Wednesday, 29 October 1947, to fill a vacancy in the 12th Dáil. It followed the death of Fianna Fáil Teachta Dála (TD) Patrick Fogarty on 2 May 1947.

In 1947, Dublin County was a five seat constituency comprising County Dublin and several townlands in Dublin city.

The writ of election to fill the vacancy was agreed by the Dáil on 8 October 1947.

The by-election was won by the Clann na Poblachta candidate Seán MacBride. It was held on the same day as the 1947 Tipperary by-election and the 1947 Waterford by-election.

Two by-elections were won by Clann na Poblachta, and one by Fianna Fáil. It was the first election victories for Clann na Poblachta, which was founded by MacBride in 1946.

The third and fourth place candidates, Éamon Rooney of Fine Gael, and Seán Dunne of Labour were both elected for Dublin County at the 1948 general election.

== Result ==
1947 Dublin County by-election
Party	Candidate	FPv%	Count		
Party	Candidate	FPv%	1	2	3
Fianna Fáil	Thomas Mullins	28.8	16,261	17,399	20,197
Clann na Poblachta	Seán MacBride	28.4	16,062	21,755	29,629
Fine Gael	Éamon Rooney	25.0	14,116	15,361	
Labour	Seán Dunne	17.8	10,067		
Electorate: 105,286 Valid: 56,506 Quota: 28,254 Turnout: 53.7%
