= Batt O'Connor =

Irish politician (1870–1935)

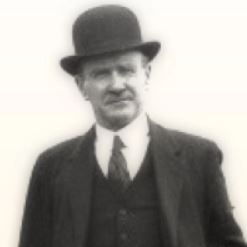
- O'Connor in 1920

Teachta Dála
- In office March 1924 – 7 February 1935
- Constituency: Dublin County

Personal details
- Born: 4 July 1870 Brosna, County Kerry, Ireland
- Died: 7 February 1935 (aged 64) Dublin, Ireland
- Party: Cumann na nGaedheal; Fine Gael
- Spouse: Bridget Dennehy
- Children: 3

Bartholomew O'Connor (4 July 1870 – 7 February 1935) was an Irish Cumann na nGaedheal (and later Fine Gael) politician. He was a Teachta Dála (TD) for Dublin County from 1924 to 1935.

== Early life ==
Batt O'Connor was born 4 July 1870 in Brosna, County Kerry, the son of mason Dan O'Connor and Ellen Curtin. At seventeen he left school to become a stonemason. In October 1893, aged twenty-three he went to Boston, where he stayed five years.

O'Connor describes participating in a Saint Patrick's Day parade in Providence, Rhode Island as a key moment in his coming to political consciousness: "I walked in the procession, and in the emotion I felt, walking as one of that vast crowd of Irish emigrants celebrating our national festival, I awoke to full consciousness of my love for my country. That awaking was one of the forces bringing me home, and it led me inevitably to the day when I joined the Gaelic League two years after my return, and to another memorable occasion when a few years later I took my oath to the Irish Republican Brotherhood by the graveside of Wolfe Tone."

On his return to Ireland, O'Connor moved to Dublin, where he soon established himself as a "speculative builder" constructing houses in Anglesea Road, Dolphins Barn, Eglington Road, and Donnybrook. O'Connor also built the houses on Brendan Road, and gave the street its name, eventually getting married and settling in No.1 Brendan Road.

== Political activities ==
O'Connor joined the Gaelic League in 1900, through which he came into contact with many of the future leaders of the independence movement, including Tom Clarke and Seán Mac Diarmada. He was sworn into the Irish Republican Brotherhood (IRB) in 1909. O'Connor enrolled in the Irish Volunteers in 1913, the same night as Éamon de Valera.

While not directly involved during the 1916 Easter Rising (he was at home in Brosna for the first week of it), O'Connor was recognised and arrested on his return to Dublin. He was sent to Kilmainham Gaol, then to Richmond Barracks, Wandsworth Prison and finally to Frongoch internment camp, in North Wales.

On his release in September 1916, O'Connor re-established his business and took up his political activities. During this period, O'Connor describes being asked by Clarke's widow to preserve writings on the wall of that house, which she held to be her husband's last message: 'We had to evacuate the GPO. The boys put up a grand fight, and that fight will save the soul of Ireland.' O'Connor had the whole square of plaster cut out intact and encased in a frame with a glass front (now on display in Collins Barracks).

O'Connor reconnected with members of the Keating Branch of the Gaelic League at 46 Parnell Square and took part in the re-organising of the fragmented IRB. He canvassed for by-elections in Kilkenny and Armagh on behalf of Sinn Féin candidates W. T. Cosgrave and Patrick McCartan.

O'Connor was involved with the revolutionary Sinn Féin party during the time of the First Dáil, handling money and hiding documents for Michael Collins. O'Connor purchased 76 Harcourt Street for Michael Collins, following a raid on the Sinn Féin Office at No. 6. There he installed a secret recess for private papers and means of escape through the skylight. When the recess escaped discovery following a raid, he went on to construct hiding places in many of the other houses used by the movement. In 5 Mespil Road, Collins' headquarters for over 15 months during the Irish War of Independence, O'Connor fitted a small cupboard in the woodwork beneath the kitchen stairs on the ground floor. Before leaving each evening, Collins would hide his papers here. When the house was finally raided in April 1921, the hideaway escaped detection. O'Connor was one of the shareholders of the National Land Bank which was set up in March 1920 at 68 Lower Leeson Street.

O'Connor played a role in the Dáil Loan (raised by Collins to fund the fledgling Dáil Éireann). According to O'Connor, the loan raised almost £400,000, of which £25,000 was in gold. The loan, which had been declared illegal, was lodged in the individual bank accounts of the trustees; the gold was kept under the floor of O'Connor's house until 1922.

O'Connor was instrumental in convincing Collins that he had to be part of the Irish team to be sent to London for the Anglo-Irish Treaty negotiations in autumn 1921.

By January 1922 O'Connor acknowledged war-weariness amongst the people. The Irish leaders realised that they could not drive the British "into the sea" as they had hoped. "Most of the commandants made a report of their fighting strength." They could "go on and fill up this whole page reports from the fighting men they all realized the resources of the country could not stand another year of war."

He took the pro-Treaty side during the subsequent split over the Anglo-Irish Treaty. During the Dáil debates, O'Connor called certain women "holy terrors" and spoke of "mud-slinging" and "name-calling." He was afraid of those six wild women in the Dáil who opposed to the Treaty. Ironically, it was O'Connor that had built the false wall in Nell Humphreys' house in Ballsbridge behind which IRA Assistant Chief of Staff Ernie O'Malley found refuge. O'Malley was severely wounded and captured there by pro-Treaty forces on 4 November after a shoot-out that cost a Free State soldier his life.

O'Connor was an unsuccessful candidate for Dáil Éireann at the 1923 general election, in the Dublin County constituency.

After the death in November 1923 of Cumann na nGaedheal TD Michael Derham, O'Connor was the Cumann na nGaedheal candidate at the Dublin County by-election on 19 March 1924, when he was elected to the 4th Dáil ahead of Seán MacEntee. He retained his seat at the next four general elections, joining Fine Gael when Cumann na nGaedheal merged in 1933 with the National Centre Party and the Blueshirts. He served as a Trustee of Cumann na nGaedheal.

He wrote a short memoir, "With Michael Collins In The Fight For Irish Independence," which was published in London by Peter Davies in 1929. Peadar O'Donnell remarked bitterly that it "was written in the strain of a garrulous war-widow who struts around in her old man's war medals, full of sighs and sidelong glances."

After O'Connor's death on 7 February 1935, the 1935 Dublin County by-election was won by Cecil Lavery of Fine Gael.

== Bibliography ==
- University College Dublin Archives
- Beaslai, Piaras, Michael Collins and the making of a New Ireland (Dublin 1926)
- Coogan, Tim Pat, Eamon de Valera (London 1993)
- Davies, Peter, With Michael Collins In The Fight For Irish Independence (London 1929)
- Knirck, Jason, Women of the Dail: Gender, Republicanism and the Anglo-Irish Treaty (Dublin 2006)
- O'Donnell, Peadar, The Gates Flew Open (Dublin 1932)
- O'Malley, Ernie, Raids and Rallies (Dublin 1982)
- Townshend, Charles, The Republic: The Fight For Irish Independence (London 2014)

Dáil	Election	Deputy (Party)	Deputy (Party)	Deputy (Party)	Deputy (Party)	Deputy (Party)	Deputy (Party)	Deputy (Party)	Deputy (Party)
2nd	1921	Michael Derham (SF)	George Gavan Duffy (SF)	Séamus Dwyer (SF)	Desmond FitzGerald (SF)	Frank Lawless (SF)	Margaret Pearse (SF)	6 seats 1921–1923	
3rd	1922	Michael Derham (PT-SF)	George Gavan Duffy (PT-SF)	Thomas Johnson (Lab)	Desmond FitzGerald (PT-SF)	Darrell Figgis (Ind)	John Rooney (FP)	6 seats 1921–1923	
4th	1923	Michael Derham (CnaG)	Bryan Cooper (Ind)	Thomas Johnson (Lab)	Desmond FitzGerald (CnaG)	Darrell Figgis (Ind)	John Good (Ind)	Kathleen Lynn (Rep)	Kevin O'Higgins (CnaG)
4th	1924 by-election	Batt O'Connor (CnaG)	Bryan Cooper (Ind)	Thomas Johnson (Lab)	Desmond FitzGerald (CnaG)	Darrell Figgis (Ind)	John Good (Ind)	Kathleen Lynn (Rep)	Kevin O'Higgins (CnaG)
4th	1926 by-election	Batt O'Connor (CnaG)	Bryan Cooper (Ind)	Thomas Johnson (Lab)	Desmond FitzGerald (CnaG)	William Norton (Lab)	John Good (Ind)	Kathleen Lynn (Rep)	Kevin O'Higgins (CnaG)
5th	1927 (Jun)	Batt O'Connor (CnaG)	Bryan Cooper (Ind)	Thomas Johnson (Lab)	Desmond FitzGerald (CnaG)	Patrick Belton (FF)	John Good (Ind)	Seán MacEntee (FF)	Kevin O'Higgins (CnaG)
5th	1927 by-election	Batt O'Connor (CnaG)	Bryan Cooper (Ind)	Thomas Johnson (Lab)	Desmond FitzGerald (CnaG)	Patrick Belton (FF)	John Good (Ind)	Seán MacEntee (FF)	Gearóid O'Sullivan (CnaG)
6th	1927 (Sep)	Batt O'Connor (CnaG)	Bryan Cooper (CnaG)	Joseph Murphy (Ind)	Desmond FitzGerald (CnaG)	Seán Brady (FF)	John Good (Ind)	Seán MacEntee (FF)	Gearóid O'Sullivan (CnaG)
6th	1930 by-election	Batt O'Connor (CnaG)	Thomas Finlay (CnaG)	Joseph Murphy (Ind)	Desmond FitzGerald (CnaG)	Seán Brady (FF)	John Good (Ind)	Seán MacEntee (FF)	Gearóid O'Sullivan (CnaG)
7th	1932	Batt O'Connor (CnaG)	Thomas Finlay (CnaG)	Patrick Curran (Lab)	Henry Dockrell (CnaG)	Seán Brady (FF)	John Good (Ind)	Seán MacEntee (FF)	Gearóid O'Sullivan (CnaG)
8th	1933	Batt O'Connor (CnaG)	John A. Costello (CnaG)	Margaret Mary Pearse (FF)	Henry Dockrell (CnaG)	Seán Brady (FF)	John Good (Ind)	Seán MacEntee (FF)	Gearóid O'Sullivan (CnaG)
8th	1935 by-election	Cecil Lavery (FG)	John A. Costello (CnaG)	Margaret Mary Pearse (FF)	Henry Dockrell (CnaG)	Seán Brady (FF)	John Good (Ind)	Seán MacEntee (FF)	Gearóid O'Sullivan (CnaG)
9th	1937	Cecil Lavery (FG)	Henry Dockrell (FG)	Gerrard McGowan (Lab)	Patrick Fogarty (FF)	Seán Brady (FF)	5 seats 1937–1948		
10th	1938	Patrick Belton (FG)	Henry Dockrell (FG)	Thomas Mullen (FF)	Patrick Fogarty (FF)	Seán Brady (FF)	5 seats 1937–1948		
11th	1943	Liam Cosgrave (FG)	Henry Dockrell (FG)	James Tunney (Lab)	Patrick Fogarty (FF)	Seán Brady (FF)	5 seats 1937–1948		
12th	1944	Liam Cosgrave (FG)	Henry Dockrell (FG)	Patrick Burke (FF)	Patrick Fogarty (FF)	Seán Brady (FF)	5 seats 1937–1948		
12th	1947 by-election	Liam Cosgrave (FG)	Henry Dockrell (FG)	Patrick Burke (FF)	Seán MacBride (CnaP)	Seán Brady (FF)	5 seats 1937–1948		
13th	1948	Éamon Rooney (FG)	Seán Dunne (Lab)	Patrick Burke (FF)	3 seats 1948–1961				
14th	1951	Éamon Rooney (FG)	Seán Dunne (Lab)	Patrick Burke (FF)	3 seats 1948–1961				
15th	1954	Éamon Rooney (FG)	Seán Dunne (Lab)	Patrick Burke (FF)	3 seats 1948–1961				
16th	1957	Éamon Rooney (FG)	Kevin Boland (FF)	Patrick Burke (FF)	3 seats 1948–1961				
17th	1961	Éamon Rooney (FG)	Kevin Boland (FF)	Patrick Burke (FF)	Mark Clinton (FG)	Seán Dunne (Ind)	5 seats 1961–1969		
18th	1965	Des Foley (FF)	Kevin Boland (FF)	Patrick Burke (FF)	Mark Clinton (FG)	Seán Dunne (Lab)	5 seats 1961–1969		
19th	1969	Constituency abolished. See Dublin County North and Dublin County South							
