= 1924 Dublin County by-election =

By-election to the 4th Dáil

- 19 March 1924
- Turnout: 42,164 (42.9%)
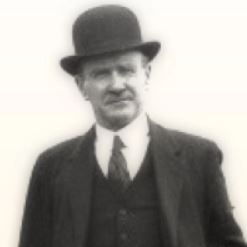

			Good
Nominee	Batt O'Connor	Seán MacEntee	Matthew Good
Party	Cumann na nGaedheal	Republican	Businessmen's Party
First preferences	16,456	10,263	9,158
Percentage	39.0%	24.3%	21.7%
Final count	24,491	12,679	–
TD before election
Michael Derham
Cumann na nGaedheal
TD after election
Batt O'Connor
Cumann na nGaedheal

A Dáil by-election was held in the constituency of Dublin County in the Irish Free State on Wednesday, 19 March 1924, to fill a vacancy in the 4th Dáil. Dublin County was an eight seat constituency comprising the administrative county of County Dublin.

Michael Derham, TD for Cumann na nGaedheal, died on 20 November 1923. On 20 February 1924, during a debate on government motion to issue the writ of election for a vacancy in Dublin South, Thomas Johnson, leader of the Labour Party, sought to amend the motion to also issue the writ for Dublin County. This amendment was defeated by a vote of 23 to 43. A government motion to issue the writ was agreed on 22 February.

The Cumann na nGaedheal candidate, Batt O'Connor, was a member of Pembroke Urban District Council and had contested the 1923 general election in Dublin County. The Republican candidate, Seán MacEntee, had represented South Monaghan from 1918 to 1921 and Monaghan from 1921 to 1922. He did not contest the 1922 Irish general election.

== Result ==
The by-election was held on 19 March 1924. The seat was won by Batt O'Connor.

1924 Dublin County by-election
Party	Candidate	FPv%	Count		
Party	Candidate	FPv%	1	2	3
Cumann na nGaedheal	Batt O'Connor	39.0	16,456	18,353	24,491
Republican	Seán MacEntee	24.3	10,263	11,760	12,679
Businessmen's Party	Matthew Good	21.7	9,158	9,705	
Labour	Archie Heron	14.9	6,287		
Electorate: 98,187 Valid: 42,164 Quota: 21,083 Turnout: 42.9%

O'Connor took his seat in Dáil Éireann on 26 March, after taking the Oath of Allegiance required under Article 17 of the Constitution of the Irish Free State.

The runner-up, Seán MacEntee, was elected at the June 1927 general election. The Labour candidate, Archie Heron, later served as a TD for Dublin North-West from 1937 to 1938.
