= James Ennis (cricketer) =

Irish cricketer (1900–1976)

Personal information
- Full name: James Tench Ennis
- Born: 27 February 1900; Naul, County Dublin, Ireland
- Died: 15 October 1976 (aged 76); Dublin, Ireland
- Batting: Right-handed

Domestic team information
- Years: Team
- 1926: Dublin University

Career statistics
Competition	First-class
Matches	1
Runs scored	0
Batting average	0.00
100s/50s	–/–
Top score	0
Catches/stumpings	–/–
- Source: Cricinfo, 2 January 2022

James Tench Ennis (27 February 1900 in County Dublin – 15 October 1976 in Dublin) was an Irish cricketer.

A right-handed batsman, he played one first-class match for Dublin University, against Northamptonshire in June 1926 and was dismissed for a duck in both innings by England test cricketer Nobby Clark.

He was later an unsuccessful candidate for Dáil Éireann in the Dublin County constituency, standing for Cumann na nGaedheal at the 1932, 1933 general elections and for Fine Gael at the 1937 general elections.
