= Dublin County North =

Dáil constituency (1969–1981)

- Former Dáil constituency

Former constituency
- Created: 1969
- Abolished: 1981
- Seats: 4 (1969–1977); 3 (1977–1981)
- Local government area: County Dublin
- Created from: Dublin County
- Replaced by: Dublin North

Dublin County North was a parliamentary constituency represented in Dáil Éireann, the lower house of the Irish parliament or Oireachtas, from 1969 to 1981. The method of election was proportional representation by means of the single transferable vote (PR-STV).

== History and boundaries ==
The constituency was created under the Electoral (Amendment) Act 1969 for the 1969 general election, electing 4 deputies (Teachtaí Dála, commonly known as TDs). Under the Electoral (Amendment) Act 1974, it was reduced to 3 seats from 1977 onwards. It was abolished by the Electoral (Amendment) Act 1980.

Changes to the constituency of Dublin County North, 1969–1981
Years	TDs	Boundaries	Notes
1969–1977	4	County Dublin, except the parts thereof which are comprised in the constituencies of Dublin County South and Dún Laoghaire and Rathdown; and the Baldoyle ward in the county borough of Dublin.	Created from Dublin County
1977–1981	3	In County Dublin, the district electoral divisions of Balbriggan Rural, Balbriggan Urban, Ballyboghil, Balscadden, Clonmethan, Coolock, Donabate, Drumcondra Rural Number One, Drumcondra Rural Number Two, Finglas, Garristown, Hollywood, Holmpatrick, Kilsallaghan, Kinsaley, Lusk, Malahide, Rush, Skerries, Swords East, Swords West; and in the county borough of Dublin, the wards of Finglas East C, Santry A.	
1981	—	Constituency abolished	See Dublin North

== TDs ==
Teachtaí Dála (TDs) for Dublin County North 1969–1981
Key to parties: FF = Fianna Fáil; FG = Fine Gael; Lab = Labour
Dáil	Election	Deputy (Party)	Deputy (Party)	Deputy (Party)	Deputy (Party)
19th	1969	Patrick Burke (FF)	Des Foley (FF)	Mark Clinton (FG)	Justin Keating (Lab)
20th	1973	Patrick Burke (FF)	Seán Walsh (FF)	Mark Clinton (FG)	Justin Keating (Lab)
21st	1977	Ray Burke (FF)	Joe Fox (FF)	John Boland (FG)	3 seats 1977–1981
22nd	1981	Constituency abolished. See Dublin North			

Note: The columns in this table are used only for presentational purposes, and no significance should be attached to the order of columns. For details of the order in which seats were won at each election, see the detailed results of that election.

== Elections ==
*: Outgoing TD

=== 1977 general election ===
1977 general election: Dublin County North
Party	Candidate	FPv%	Count						
Party	Candidate	FPv%	1	2	3	4	5	6	7
Fianna Fáil	Ray Burke	33.0	11,794						
Fine Gael	John Boland	20.6	7,367	7,456	7,575	9,101			
Fianna Fáil	Patricia McGill	12.2	4,340	5,108	5,140	5,230	5,677	5,692	6,571
Fianna Fáil	Joe Fox	10.1	3,618	5,479	5,514	5,578	5,896	5,906	6,870
Labour	Patrick Murphy	9.5	3,373	3,415	4,334	4,464	5,536	5,684	
Independent	Eamonn O'Brien	6.1	2,189	2,226	2,337	2,364			
Fine Gael	John Corry	5.0	1,770	1,808	1,866				
Labour	Seán Ryan	3.5	1,260	1,291					
Electorate: 52,608 Valid: 35,711 Spoilt: 309 (0.9%) Quota: 8,928 Turnout: 36,020 (68.4%)

=== 1973 general election ===
1973 general election: Dublin County North
Party	Candidate	FPv%	Count							
Party	Candidate	FPv%	1	2	3	4	5	6	7	8
Fianna Fáil	Ray Burke	24.1	10,652							
Fine Gael	Mark Clinton	12.9	5,730	5,771	6,375	6,542	6,605	7,000	7,616	8,047
Labour	Justin Keating	12.6	5,570	5,594	5,681	6,692	7,041	9,614		
Fianna Fáil	Seán Walsh	12.2	5,381	5,786	5,816	5,931	8,134	8,293	9,612	
Fine Gael	John Boland	11.9	5,263	5,294	5,609	5,733	5,771	6,022	6,475	6,804
Independent	Des Foley	7.7	3,387	3,502	3,616	3,683	3,857	4,009		
Labour	Michael Gannon	7.3	3,215	3,245	3,299	3,652	3,721			
Labour	Máire Walsh	5.0	2,226	2,269	2,295					
Fianna Fáil	Seán Dungan	3.6	1,588	2,681	2,699	2,829				
Fine Gael	Denis Farrell	2.8	1,253	1,269						
Electorate: 58,761 Valid: 44,265 Quota: 8,854 Turnout: 75.3%

=== 1969 general election ===
1969 general election: Dublin County North
Party	Candidate	FPv%	Count									
Party	Candidate	FPv%	1	2	3	4	5	6	7	8	9	10
Fianna Fáil	Patrick Burke	21.8	8,050									
Fianna Fáil	Des Foley	14.1	5,231	5,283	5,729	5,850	5,968	6,032	6,172	6,388	9,455	
Labour	Justin Keating	11.4	4,198	4,229	4,244	5,026	5,140	6,205	6,366	6,679	6,934	7,231
Fine Gael	Mark Clinton	11.0	4,050	4,264	4,284	4,346	5,786	5,912	8,261			
Fianna Fáil	Seán Walsh	9.0	3,335	3,343	3,456	3,473	3,501	3,650	3,712	3,791		
Labour	Michael Gannon	7.8	2,900	2,908	2,926	3,353	3,397	4,437	4,563	4,821	4,965	5,249
Fine Gael	John Boland	6.4	2,368	2,502	2,515	2,540	3,037	3,081				
Labour	Joseph Connolly	6.2	2,281	2,300	2,307	2,522	2,553					
Fine Gael	Éamon Rooney	5.6	2,092	2,267	2,279	2,397						
Labour	Patrick Murphy	4.8	1,778	1,814								
Fine Gael	Anthony Butterley	1.9	688									
Electorate: 49,502 Valid: 36,971 Quota: 7,395 Turnout: 74.7%

== See also ==
- Dáil constituencies
- Politics of the Republic of Ireland
- Historic Dáil constituencies
- Elections in the Republic of Ireland

== Notes, citations and sources ==
=== External links ===
- Oireachtas Members Database
- Dublin Historic Maps: Parliamentary & Dail Constituencies 1780–1969 (a work in progress)
