= Des Foley =

Irish politician, hurler and Gaelic footballer (1940–1995)

Teachta Dála
- In office June 1969 – February 1973
- Constituency: Dublin County North
- In office April 1965 – June 1969
- Constituency: Dublin County

Personal details
- Born: 12 September 1940 North Strand, County Dublin, Ireland
- Died: 5 February 1995 (aged 54) Dublin, Ireland
- Party: Fianna Fáil; Independent
- Spouse: Rita Nugent
- Education: St Joseph's, Fairview

Des Foley
Sport
- Football Position: Midfield
- Hurling Position: Midfield
Club
- Years: Club
- St Vincents
Club titles
	Football	Hurling
Dublin titles	1	4
Inter-county
- Years: County
- 1958–1969: Dublin
Inter-county titles
	Football	Hurling
Leinster Titles	5	1
All-Ireland Titles	1	0
League titles	1	0
All-Stars	2	1

Desmond Foley (12 September 1940 – 5 February 1995) was an Irish Gaelic footballer and hurler of the 1950s and 1960s. He was also a politician and represented Fianna Fáil in Dáil Éireann.

== Sports ==
Desmond Foley was born into a farming family at Kinsealy, County Dublin in 1940. As a young man he showed particular skill at Gaelic games, winning four Dublin County Senior Hurling Championships with the St Vincents GAA club, having earlier captained the school team of St Joseph's, Fairview which brought the All-Ireland Colleges football title to Dublin for the first time. Foley captained the Dublin minor football team which won the All-Ireland Final in 1958. In 1962 he became the only player in history to play in two provincial Railway Cup finals, in hurling and football, on the same day, winning medals in both codes for Leinster. He won further Railway Cup medals again in 1964 and 1965.

Foley was a prominent member of the Dublin county hurling team from 1958 until 1969, playing on the losing side in the 1961 All-Ireland Senior Hurling Championship Final. In 1963 he captained the Dublin county football team which defeated Galway to win the All-Ireland title. He won three All-Star awards, two for football and one for hurling, but never a senior All-Ireland hurling medal. He was a mid-fielder of the highest ranking, particularly noted for his outstanding sportsmanship. His brother Lar Foley was a team colleague, both in hurling and football, through most of his campaigns in the 1950s and 60s and who was also an All-Ireland medal winner for Gaelic football in 1958 and 1963.

== Politics ==
Towards the end of his playing career, Foley became interested in politics and was elected to Dáil Éireann as a Fianna Fáil Teachta Dála (TD) for Dublin County at the 1965 general election, and for Dublin County North at the 1969 general election. He resigned from the Fianna Fáil parliamentary party on 4 November 1971, in advance of a confidence motion in Jim Gibbons, whose role in the Arms Crisis he disagreed with. He unsuccessfully contested the 1973 general election in Dublin County North as an independent candidate.

Des Foley died in Dublin in 1995.

Honorary titles
Preceded by Lorcan Allen	Baby of the Dáil; 1965–1969	Succeeded by John Bruton

Dáil	Election	Deputy (Party)	Deputy (Party)	Deputy (Party)	Deputy (Party)	Deputy (Party)	Deputy (Party)	Deputy (Party)	Deputy (Party)
2nd	1921	Michael Derham (SF)	George Gavan Duffy (SF)	Séamus Dwyer (SF)	Desmond FitzGerald (SF)	Frank Lawless (SF)	Margaret Pearse (SF)	6 seats 1921–1923	
3rd	1922	Michael Derham (PT-SF)	George Gavan Duffy (PT-SF)	Thomas Johnson (Lab)	Desmond FitzGerald (PT-SF)	Darrell Figgis (Ind)	John Rooney (FP)	6 seats 1921–1923	
4th	1923	Michael Derham (CnaG)	Bryan Cooper (Ind)	Thomas Johnson (Lab)	Desmond FitzGerald (CnaG)	Darrell Figgis (Ind)	John Good (Ind)	Kathleen Lynn (Rep)	Kevin O'Higgins (CnaG)
4th	1924 by-election	Batt O'Connor (CnaG)	Bryan Cooper (Ind)	Thomas Johnson (Lab)	Desmond FitzGerald (CnaG)	Darrell Figgis (Ind)	John Good (Ind)	Kathleen Lynn (Rep)	Kevin O'Higgins (CnaG)
4th	1926 by-election	Batt O'Connor (CnaG)	Bryan Cooper (Ind)	Thomas Johnson (Lab)	Desmond FitzGerald (CnaG)	William Norton (Lab)	John Good (Ind)	Kathleen Lynn (Rep)	Kevin O'Higgins (CnaG)
5th	1927 (Jun)	Batt O'Connor (CnaG)	Bryan Cooper (Ind)	Thomas Johnson (Lab)	Desmond FitzGerald (CnaG)	Patrick Belton (FF)	John Good (Ind)	Seán MacEntee (FF)	Kevin O'Higgins (CnaG)
5th	1927 by-election	Batt O'Connor (CnaG)	Bryan Cooper (Ind)	Thomas Johnson (Lab)	Desmond FitzGerald (CnaG)	Patrick Belton (FF)	John Good (Ind)	Seán MacEntee (FF)	Gearóid O'Sullivan (CnaG)
6th	1927 (Sep)	Batt O'Connor (CnaG)	Bryan Cooper (CnaG)	Joseph Murphy (Ind)	Desmond FitzGerald (CnaG)	Seán Brady (FF)	John Good (Ind)	Seán MacEntee (FF)	Gearóid O'Sullivan (CnaG)
6th	1930 by-election	Batt O'Connor (CnaG)	Thomas Finlay (CnaG)	Joseph Murphy (Ind)	Desmond FitzGerald (CnaG)	Seán Brady (FF)	John Good (Ind)	Seán MacEntee (FF)	Gearóid O'Sullivan (CnaG)
7th	1932	Batt O'Connor (CnaG)	Thomas Finlay (CnaG)	Patrick Curran (Lab)	Henry Dockrell (CnaG)	Seán Brady (FF)	John Good (Ind)	Seán MacEntee (FF)	Gearóid O'Sullivan (CnaG)
8th	1933	Batt O'Connor (CnaG)	John A. Costello (CnaG)	Margaret Mary Pearse (FF)	Henry Dockrell (CnaG)	Seán Brady (FF)	John Good (Ind)	Seán MacEntee (FF)	Gearóid O'Sullivan (CnaG)
8th	1935 by-election	Cecil Lavery (FG)	John A. Costello (CnaG)	Margaret Mary Pearse (FF)	Henry Dockrell (CnaG)	Seán Brady (FF)	John Good (Ind)	Seán MacEntee (FF)	Gearóid O'Sullivan (CnaG)
9th	1937	Cecil Lavery (FG)	Henry Dockrell (FG)	Gerrard McGowan (Lab)	Patrick Fogarty (FF)	Seán Brady (FF)	5 seats 1937–1948		
10th	1938	Patrick Belton (FG)	Henry Dockrell (FG)	Thomas Mullen (FF)	Patrick Fogarty (FF)	Seán Brady (FF)	5 seats 1937–1948		
11th	1943	Liam Cosgrave (FG)	Henry Dockrell (FG)	James Tunney (Lab)	Patrick Fogarty (FF)	Seán Brady (FF)	5 seats 1937–1948		
12th	1944	Liam Cosgrave (FG)	Henry Dockrell (FG)	Patrick Burke (FF)	Patrick Fogarty (FF)	Seán Brady (FF)	5 seats 1937–1948		
12th	1947 by-election	Liam Cosgrave (FG)	Henry Dockrell (FG)	Patrick Burke (FF)	Seán MacBride (CnaP)	Seán Brady (FF)	5 seats 1937–1948		
13th	1948	Éamon Rooney (FG)	Seán Dunne (Lab)	Patrick Burke (FF)	3 seats 1948–1961				
14th	1951	Éamon Rooney (FG)	Seán Dunne (Lab)	Patrick Burke (FF)	3 seats 1948–1961				
15th	1954	Éamon Rooney (FG)	Seán Dunne (Lab)	Patrick Burke (FF)	3 seats 1948–1961				
16th	1957	Éamon Rooney (FG)	Kevin Boland (FF)	Patrick Burke (FF)	3 seats 1948–1961				
17th	1961	Éamon Rooney (FG)	Kevin Boland (FF)	Patrick Burke (FF)	Mark Clinton (FG)	Seán Dunne (Ind)	5 seats 1961–1969		
18th	1965	Des Foley (FF)	Kevin Boland (FF)	Patrick Burke (FF)	Mark Clinton (FG)	Seán Dunne (Lab)	5 seats 1961–1969		
19th	1969	Constituency abolished. See Dublin County North and Dublin County South							

Dáil	Election	Deputy (Party)	Deputy (Party)	Deputy (Party)	Deputy (Party)
19th	1969	Patrick Burke (FF)	Des Foley (FF)	Mark Clinton (FG)	Justin Keating (Lab)
20th	1973	Patrick Burke (FF)	Seán Walsh (FF)	Mark Clinton (FG)	Justin Keating (Lab)
21st	1977	Ray Burke (FF)	Joe Fox (FF)	John Boland (FG)	3 seats 1977–1981
22nd	1981	Constituency abolished. See Dublin North			
