= List of Dáil by-elections =

By-elections to Dáil Éireann, the house of representatives of the Oireachtas (the legislature of Ireland), occur to fill vacant seats which can be caused by the death, resignation, disqualification or expulsion of a member of the Dáil, known as a Teachta Dála (TD).

== Statistical overview ==
There have been 138 by-elections since 1923, to fill 140 vacancies. Ninety-three of these were caused by the death of a sitting TD. There were no by-elections during the 3rd, 7th, 9th, 11th, 22nd, 25th and 26th Dála. The longest period without a by-election was almost 10 years between 1984 and 1994. The largest number of by-elections on one day was on 11 March 1925, when seven constituencies filled nine vacancies caused by the National Group's split from Cumann na nGaedheal. Those seven by-elections included two which filled two vacancies, via the single transferable vote. All the other by-elections have used its single-winner analogue, instant-runoff voting.

Twenty-five TDs who were elected at a by-election were not subsequently re-elected at a general election. The only person twice elected at by-elections was Thomas Hennessy.

== Timing ==
Prior to 2011, there was no requirement for a by-election to be held when a vacancy occurred. During the 10th Dáil, after one by-election was held in 1940, no further by-elections were held before the dissolution in 1943, considering difficulties during the Emergency. Writing in 1996, Michael Gallagher gave 521 days as the longest interval between the creation of a vacancy and the holding of the resultant by-election, between the resignation in Mayo West of Pádraig Flynn of Fianna Fáil in January 1993, and the ensuing by-election in June 1994. In April 1993, Proinsias De Rossa of Democratic Left moved motions in the Dáil that the Ceann Comhairle issue by-election writs for both the Mayo West vacancy and a slightly later one in Dublin South-Central. The Fianna Fáil–Labour government defeated the motions, and both government parties' leaders said the by-elections would not be held until summer 1994. In June 1993, a private citizen argued in the High Court that such a delay was undemocratic and unconstitutional, but the court refused to order the government to act, on the grounds that it was "an effort to interfere in the functions of the executive" and that the applicant was not a voter in either constituency.

In November 2010, the High Court granted a declaration that there had been unreasonable delay in holding a by-election in Donegal South-West for a seat which had remained vacant since June 2009. The consequent by-election was held later that month, leading to an interval of 539 days. The Electoral (Amendment) Act 2011 amended the Electoral Act 1992 such that a by-election writ must be issued within six months of the vacancy.

== First and Second Dáil ==
The First Dáil was established by Sinn Féin members returned in the 1918 election to the House of Commons of the United Kingdom. Convention in the Commons was that the writ for a by-election be moved by a party colleague of the vacating member, which was impossible for the abstentionist Sinn Féin. There were three by-elections held for Westminster constituencies vacated by Unionist members during the lifetime of the First Dáil, all of whom took their seats in Westminster.

Winner	Party	Constituency	Date	Outgoing	Party	Reason for vacancy	Notes
Hugh T. Barrie	U	North Londonderry	4 March 1919	Hugh Anderson	U	Resignation	This was the only by-election contested by Sinn Féin, Patrick McGilligan losing.
George Hanna	Ind U	East Antrim	27 May 1919	Robert McCalmont	U	Appointed commander of the Irish Guards	
William Jellett	U	Dublin University	28 July 1919	Arthur Samuels	U	Appointed to the High Court of Justice in Ireland	William Jellett was returned unopposed.

The Second Dáil comprised those returned in the 1921 elections to the House of Commons of Southern Ireland and the House of Commons of Northern Ireland. There were no by-elections to either body during the lifetime of the Second Dáil.

== By-elections since 1923 ==
- 4th Dáil (1923–1927)
- 5th Dáil (1927)
- 6th Dáil (1927–1932)
- 7th Dáil (1932–1933)
- 8th Dáil (1933–1937)
- 9th Dáil (1937–1938)
- 10th Dáil (1938–1943)
- 11th Dáil (1943–1944)
- 12th Dáil (1944–1948)
- 13th Dáil (1948–1951)
- 14th Dáil (1951–1954)
- 15th Dáil (1954–1957)
- 16th Dáil (1957–1961)
- 17th Dáil (1961–1965)
- 18th Dáil (1965–1969)
- 19th Dáil (1969–1973)
- 20th Dáil (1973–1977)
- 21st Dáil (1977–1981)
- 22nd Dáil (1981–1982)
- 23rd Dáil (1982)
- 24th Dáil (1982–1987)
- 25th Dáil (1987–1989)
- 26th Dáil (1989–1992)
- 27th Dáil (1992–1997)
- 28th Dáil (1997–2002)
- 29th Dáil (2002–2007)
- 30th Dáil (2007–2011)
- 31st Dáil (2011–2016)
- 32nd Dáil (2016–2020)
- 33rd Dáil (2020–2024)
- 34th Dáil (2024–)

By-elections in which seats changed parties are indicated with a grey background.

Dáil	Constituency	Vacancy			By-election		
Dáil	Constituency	Outgoing	Party	Cause	Date	Winner	Party
4th	Dublin South	Michael Hayes	CnaG	Elected for two constituencies; chose to represent NUI	27 October 1923	Hugh Kennedy (Note: TDs who were never subsequently re-elected.)	CnaG
4th	National University	Eoin MacNeill	CnaG	Elected for two constituencies; chose to represent Clare	3 November 1923	Patrick McGilligan	CnaG
4th	Dublin South	Philip Cosgrave	CnaG	Death	12 March 1924	James O'Mara	CnaG
4th	Dublin County	Michael Derham	CnaG	Death	19 March 1924	Batt O'Connor	CnaG
4th	Limerick	Richard Hayes	CnaG	Resignation	28 May 1924	Richard O'Connell	CnaG
4th	Cork East	Thomas O'Mahony	CnaG	Death	18 November 1924	Michael K. Noonan	CnaG
4th	Dublin South	Hugh Kennedy	CnaG	Incompatible office: appointed as Chief Justice	18 November 1924	Seán Lemass (Note: Did not take seat on election due to policy of abstentionism.)	Rep
4th	Mayo North	Henry Coyle	CnaG	Disqualification	18 November 1924	John Madden	Rep
4th	Cork Borough	Alfred O'Rahilly	CnaG	Resignation	19 November 1924	Michael Egan	CnaG
4th	Donegal	Peter J. Ward	CnaG	Resignation	20 November 1924	Denis McCullough	CnaG
4th	Carlow–Kilkenny	Seán Gibbons	NG	Resignation	11 March 1925	Thomas Bolger	CnaG
4th	Cavan	Seán Milroy	NG	Resignation	11 March 1925	John Joe O'Reilly	CnaG
4th	Dublin North (Note: A single by-election to fill two vacancies in the same constituency.)	Francis Cahill	NG	Resignation	11 March 1925	Patrick Leonard	CnaG
4th	Dublin North	Seán McGarry	NG	Resignation	11 March 1925	Oscar Traynor	Rep
4th	Dublin South	Daniel McCarthy	NG	Resignation	11 March 1925	Thomas Hennessy	CnaG
4th	Leitrim–Sligo	Thomas Carter	NG	Resignation	11 March 1925	Samuel Holt	Rep
4th	Leitrim–Sligo	Alexander McCabe	NG	Resignation	11 March 1925	Martin Roddy	CnaG
4th	Mayo North	Joseph McGrath	NG	Resignation	11 March 1925	Michael Tierney	CnaG
4th	Roscommon	Henry Finlay	NG	Resignation	11 March 1925	Martin Conlon	CnaG
4th	Dublin County	Darrell Figgis	Ind.	Death	18 February 1926	William Norton	Lab
4th	Leix–Offaly	Seán McGuinness	Rep	Disqualification	18 February 1926	James Dwyer	CnaG
5th	Dublin County	Kevin O'Higgins	CnaG	Death (assassination)	24 August 1927	Gearóid O'Sullivan (Note: Did not take seat on election due to the dissolution of the Dáil.)	CnaG
5th	Dublin South	Constance Markievicz	FF	Death	24 August 1927	Thomas Hennessy	CnaG
6th	Carlow–Kilkenny	W. T. Cosgrave	CnaG	Elected for two constituencies; chose to represent Cork Borough	3 November 1927	Denis Gorey	CnaG
6th	Dublin North	James Larkin	IWL	Disqualification due to bankruptcy	3 April 1928	Vincent Rice	CnaG
6th	Dublin North	Alfie Byrne	Ind.	Incompatible office: elected to Seanad Éireann	14 March 1929	Thomas F. O'Higgins	CnaG
6th	Leitrim–Sligo	Samuel Holt	FF	Death	7 June 1929	Seán Mac Eoin	CnaG
6th	Longford–Westmeath	James Killane	FF	Death	13 June 1930	James Geoghegan	FF
6th	Dublin County	Bryan Cooper	CnaG	Death	9 December 1930	Thomas Finlay	CnaG
6th	Kildare	Hugh Colohan	Lab	Death	29 June 1931	Thomas Harris	FF
8th	Dublin University	James Craig	Ind.	Death	13 October 1933	Robert Rowlette	Ind.
8th	Dublin County	Batt O'Connor	FG	Death	17 June 1935	Cecil Lavery	FG
8th	Galway	Martin McDonogh	FG	Death	19 June 1935	Eamon Corbett	FF
8th	Galway	Patrick Hogan	FG	Death	13 August 1936	Martin Neilan	FF
8th	Wexford	Osmond Esmonde	FG	Death	17 August 1936	Denis Allen	FF
10th	Dublin South	James Beckett	FG	Death	6 June 1939	John McCann	FF
10th	Galway West	Seán Tubridy	FF	Death	30 May 1940	John J. Keane	FF
12th	Kerry South	Fionán Lynch	FG	Incompatible office: appointed as a Judge	10 November 1944	Donal O'Donoghue	FF
12th	Clare	Patrick Burke	FG	Death	4 December 1945	Patrick Shanahan	FF
12th	Dublin North-West	Seán T. O'Kelly	FF	Incompatible office: elected as President	4 December 1945	Vivion de Valera	FF
12th	Kerry South	Frederick Crowley	FF	Death	4 December 1945	Honor Crowley	FF
12th	Mayo South	Micheál Clery	FF	Incompatible office: appointed as County Registrar of Dublin	4 December 1945	Bernard Commons	CnaT
12th	Wexford	Richard Corish	Lab	Death	4 December 1945	Brendan Corish	Lab
12th	Cork Borough	William Dwyer	Ind.	Resignation	14 June 1946	Patrick McGrath	FF
12th	Dublin County	Patrick Fogarty	FF	Death	29 October 1947	Seán MacBride	CnaP
12th	Tipperary	William O'Donnell	CnaT	Death	29 October 1947	Patrick Kinane	CnaP
12th	Waterford	Michael Morrissey	FF	Death	29 October 1947	John Ormonde	FF
13th	Donegal East	Neal Blaney	FF	Death	7 December 1948	Neil Blaney	FF
13th	Cork West	Timothy J. Murphy	Lab	Death	15 June 1949	William J. Murphy	Lab
13th	Donegal West	Brian Brady	FF	Death	16 November 1949	Patrick O'Donnell	FG
14th	Limerick East	Daniel Bourke	FF	Death	26 June 1952	John Carew	FG
14th	Mayo North	P. J. Ruttledge	FF	Death	26 June 1952	Phelim Calleary	FF
14th	Waterford	Bridget Redmond	FG	Death	26 June 1952	William Kenneally	FF
14th	Dublin North-West	A. P. Byrne	Ind.	Death	12 November 1952	Thomas Byrne	Ind.
14th	Cork East	Seán Keane	Lab	Death	18 June 1953	Richard Barry	FG
14th	Wicklow	Thomas Brennan	FF	Death	18 June 1953	Mark Deering	FG
14th	Galway South	Frank Fahy	FF	Death	21 August 1953	Robert Lahiffe	FF
14th	Cork Borough	Thomas F. O'Higgins	FG	Death	3 March 1954	Stephen Barrett	FG
14th	Louth	James Coburn	FG	Death	3 March 1954	George Coburn	FG
15th	Limerick West	David Madden	FG	Death	13 December 1955	Michael Colbert	FF
15th	Kerry North	Johnny Connor	CnaP	Death	29 February 1956	Kathleen O'Connor	CnaP
15th	Dublin North-East	Alfie Byrne	Ind.	Death	30 April 1956	Patrick Byrne	Ind.
15th	Leix–Offaly	William Davin	Lab	Death	30 April 1956	Kieran Egan	FF
15th	Cork Borough	Patrick McGrath	FF	Death	2 August 1956	John Galvin	FF
15th	Carlow–Kilkenny	Thomas Walsh	FF	Death	14 November 1956	Martin Medlar	FF
15th	Dublin South-West	Peadar Doyle	FG	Death	14 November 1956	Noel Lemass	FF
16th	Dublin North-Central	Colm Gallagher	FF	Death	14 November 1957	Frank Sherwin	Ind.
16th	Galway South	Patrick Beegan	FF	Death	30 May 1958	Anthony Millar	FF
16th	Dublin South-Central	Jack Murphy	Ind.	Resignation	25 June 1958	Patrick Cummins	FF
16th	Clare	Éamon de Valera	FF	Incompatible office: elected as President	22 July 1959	Seán Ó Ceallaigh	FF
16th	Dublin South-West	Bernard Butler	FF	Death	22 July 1959	Richie Ryan	FG
16th	Meath	James Griffin	FF	Death	22 July 1959	Henry Johnston	FF
16th	Carlow–Kilkenny	Joseph Hughes	FG	Death	23 June 1960	Patrick Teehan	FF
16th	Sligo–Leitrim	Stephen Flynn	FF	Death	1 March 1961	Joseph McLoughlin	FG
17th	Dublin North-East	Jack Belton	FG	Death	30 May 1963	Paddy Belton	FG
17th	Cork Borough	John Galvin	FF	Death	19 February 1964	Sheila Galvin	FF
17th	Kildare	William Norton	Lab	Death	19 February 1964	Terence Boylan	FF
17th	Roscommon	James Burke	FG	Death	8 July 1964	Joan Burke	FG
17th	Galway East	Michael Donnellan	CnaT	Death	3 December 1964	John Donnellan	FG
17th	Cork Mid	Dan Desmond	Lab	Death	10 March 1965	Eileen Desmond	Lab
18th	Kerry South	Honor Crowley	FF	Death	7 December 1966	John O'Leary	FF
18th	Waterford	Thaddeus Lynch	FG	Death	7 December 1966	Fad Browne	FF
18th	Cork Borough	Seán Casey	Lab	Death	9 November 1967	Seán French	FF
18th	Limerick West	James Collins	FF	Death	9 November 1967	Gerry Collins	FF
18th	Clare	William Murphy	FG	Death	14 March 1968	Sylvester Barrett	FF
18th	Wicklow	James Everett	Lab	Death	14 March 1968	Godfrey Timmins	FG
18th	Limerick East	Donogh O'Malley	FF	Death	22 May 1968	Desmond O'Malley	FF
19th	Dublin South-West	Seán Dunne	Lab	Death	4 March 1970	Seán Sherwin	FF
19th	Kildare	Gerard Sweetman	FG	Death	14 April 1970	Patrick Malone	FG
19th	Longford–Westmeath	Patrick Lenihan	FF	Death	14 April 1970	Patrick Cooney	FG
19th	Donegal–Leitrim	Patrick O'Donnell	FG	Death	2 December 1970	Patrick Delap	FF
19th	Dublin County South	Kevin Boland	FF	Resignation	2 December 1970	Larry McMahon	FG
19th	Cork Mid	Paddy Forde	FF	Death	2 August 1972	Gene Fitzgerald	FF
20th	Monaghan	Erskine H. Childers	FF	Incompatible office: elected as President	27 November 1973	Brendan Toal	FG
20th	Cork North-East	Liam Ahern	FF	Death	13 November 1974	Seán Brosnan	FF
20th	Galway North-East	Michael F. Kitt	FF	Death	4 March 1975	Michael P. Kitt	FF
20th	Galway West	Johnny Geoghegan	FF	Death	4 March 1975	Máire Geoghegan-Quinn	FF
20th	Mayo West	Henry Kenny	FG	Death	12 November 1975	Enda Kenny	FG
20th	Donegal North-East	Liam Cunningham	FF	Death	10 June 1976	Paddy Keaveney	IFF
20th	Dublin South-West	Noel Lemass	FF	Death	10 June 1976	Brendan Halligan	Lab
21st	Cork City	Patrick Kerrigan	Lab	Death	7 November 1979	Liam Burke	FG
21st	Cork North-East	Seán Brosnan	FF	Death	7 November 1979	Myra Barry	FG
21st	Donegal	Joseph Brennan	CC	Death	6 November 1980	Clement Coughlan	FF
23rd	Dublin West	Richard Burke	FG	Resignation	25 May 1982	Liam Skelly	FG
23rd	Galway East	Johnny Callanan	FF	Death	20 July 1982	Noel Treacy	FF
24th	Donegal South-West	Clement Coughlan	FF	Death	13 May 1983	Cathal Coughlan	FF
24th	Dublin Central	George Colley	FF	Death	23 November 1983	Tom Leonard	FF
24th	Laois–Offaly	Bernard Cowen	FF	Death	14 June 1984	Brian Cowen	FF
27th	Dublin South-Central	John O'Connell	FF	Resignation	9 June 1994	Eric Byrne	DL
27th	Mayo West	Pádraig Flynn	FF	Resignation	9 June 1994	Michael Ring	FG
27th	Cork North-Central	Gerry O'Sullivan	Lab	Death	10 November 1994	Kathleen Lynch	DL
27th	Cork South-Central	Pat Cox	Ind.	Resignation	10 November 1994	Hugh Coveney	FG
27th	Wicklow	Johnny Fox	Ind.	Death	29 June 1995	Mildred Fox	Ind.
27th	Donegal North-East	Neil Blaney	IFF	Death	2 April 1996	Cecilia Keaveney	FF
27th	Dublin West	Brian Lenihan Snr	FF	Death	2 April 1996	Brian Lenihan Jnr	FF
28th	Dublin North	Ray Burke	FF	Resignation	11 March 1998	Seán Ryan	Lab
28th	Limerick East	Jim Kemmy	Lab	Death	11 March 1998	Jan O'Sullivan	Lab
28th	Cork South-Central	Hugh Coveney	FG	Death	23 October 1998	Simon Coveney	FG
28th	Dublin South-Central	Pat Upton	Lab	Death	27 October 1999	Mary Upton	Lab
28th	Tipperary South	Michael Ferris	Lab	Death	22 June 2000	Séamus Healy	Ind.
28th	Tipperary South	Theresa Ahearn	FG	Death	30 June 2001	Tom Hayes	FG
29th	Kildare North	Charlie McCreevy	FF	Resignation	11 March 2005	Catherine Murphy	Ind.
29th	Meath	John Bruton	FG	Resignation	11 March 2005	Shane McEntee	FG
30th	Dublin Central	Tony Gregory	Ind.	Death	5 June 2009	Maureen O'Sullivan	Ind.
30th	Dublin South	Séamus Brennan	FF	Death	5 June 2009	George Lee	FG
30th	Donegal South-West	Pat "the Cope" Gallagher	FF	Incompatible office: elected as MEP	25 November 2010	Pearse Doherty	SF
31st	Dublin West	Brian Lenihan Jnr	FF	Death	27 October 2011	Patrick Nulty	Lab
31st	Meath East	Shane McEntee	FG	Death	27 March 2013	Helen McEntee	FG
31st	Dublin West	Patrick Nulty	Ind.	Resignation	23 May 2014	Ruth Coppinger	SP
31st	Longford–Westmeath	Nicky McFadden	FG	Death	23 May 2014	Gabrielle McFadden	FG
31st	Dublin South-West	Brian Hayes	FG	Incompatible office: elected as MEP	10 October 2014	Paul Murphy	AAA
31st	Roscommon–South Leitrim	Luke 'Ming' Flanagan	Ind.	Incompatible office: elected as MEP	10 October 2014	Michael Fitzmaurice	Ind.
31st	Carlow–Kilkenny	Phil Hogan	FG	Resignation	22 May 2015	Bobby Aylward	FF
32nd	Cork North-Central	Billy Kelleher	FF	Incompatible office: elected as MEP	29 November 2019	Pádraig O'Sullivan	FF
32nd	Dublin Fingal	Clare Daly	I4C	Incompatible office: elected as MEP	29 November 2019	Joe O'Brien	GP
32nd	Dublin Mid-West	Frances Fitzgerald	FG	Incompatible office: elected as MEP	29 November 2019	Mark Ward	SF
32nd	Wexford	Mick Wallace	I4C	Incompatible office: elected as MEP	29 November 2019	Malcolm Byrne	FF
33rd	Dublin Bay South	Eoghan Murphy	FG	Resignation	8 July 2021	Ivana Bacik	Lab
34th	Dublin Central	Paschal Donohoe	FG	Resignation	22 May 2026	Daniel Ennis	SD
34th	Galway West	Catherine Connolly	Ind.	Incompatible office: elected as President	22 May 2026	Seán Kyne	FG

== Vacancies not filled ==
When Pierce McCan died on 6 March 1919, his East Tipperary seat was left vacant. In April 1919 a Dáil committee considering how to fill the vacancy considered allowing nomination by the Labour Party (which had stood aside in the 1918 election to avoid splitting the nationalist vote) before recommending that the Sinn Féin constituency organisation should nominate. However, in June 1919 the Dáil decided that "it was due to the memory of the late Pierce McCann that his place should not be filled at present". Later vacancies were also left unfilled; when Diarmuid Lynch resigned his seat in 1920, Arthur Griffith said "as the letter of resignation was addressed to the people of South-East Cork, the next step in the matter lay with the South-East Cork Executive of Sinn Fein". Asked in the Civil War about filling 3rd Dáil vacancies, W. T. Cosgrave as Chairman of the Provisional Government stated "the condition of the country scarcely warrants the holding of elections".

In the first Dáil, four Sinn Féin TDs represented two constituencies: Éamon de Valera, Arthur Griffith, Eoin MacNeill and Liam Mellowes. Ordinarily, this would prompt them to choose one constituency to represent, and to move a writ for a by-election in the other constituency.

Dáil	Constituency	Outgoing TD	Party	Reason for vacancy	Date of vacancy	Date of dissolution
1st	East Tipperary	Pierce McCan	SF	Death in prison	6 March 1919	10 May 1921
1st	South East Cork	Diarmuid Lynch	SF	Resignation	6 August 1920	10 May 1921
1st	Mid Cork	Terence MacSwiney	SF	Death on hunger strike	25 October 1920	10 May 1921
1st	North Wexford	Roger Sweetman	SF	Resignation	27 January 1921	10 May 1921
2nd	Waterford–Tipperary East	Frank Drohan	SF	Resignation	5 January 1922	16 June 1922
2nd	Dublin County	Frank Lawless	SF	Death	16 April 1922	16 June 1922
2nd	Longford–Westmeath	Joseph McGuinness	SF	Death	31 May 1922	16 June 1922
3rd	Waterford–Tipperary East	Cathal Brugha	AT-SF	Death: Shot during the Civil War	7 July 1922	9 August 1923
3rd	Mayo South–Roscommon South	Harry Boland	AT-SF	Death: Shot during the Civil War	1 August 1922	9 August 1923
3rd	Cavan	Arthur Griffith	PT-SF	Death	12 August 1922	9 August 1923
3rd	Cork Mid, North, South, South East and West	Michael Collins	PT-SF	Death: Shot during the Civil War	22 August 1922	9 August 1923
3rd	Sligo–Mayo East	James Devins	AT-SF	Death: Shot during the Civil War	20 September 1922	9 August 1923
3rd	Mayo South–Roscommon South	Daniel O'Rourke	PT-SF	Resignation	29 November 1922	9 August 1923
3rd	Cork Mid, North, South, South East and West	Seán Hales	PT-SF	Death: Shot during the Civil War	7 December 1922	9 August 1923
3rd	Clare	Patrick Brennan	PT-SF	Resignation	13 December 1922	9 August 1923
3rd	Clare	Seán Liddy	PT-SF	Resignation	18 December 1922	9 August 1923
3rd	Tipperary Mid, North and South	Joseph MacDonagh	AT-SF	Death on hunger strike	25 December 1922	9 August 1923
3rd	Sligo–Mayo East	Francis Ferran	AT-SF	Death in prison	10 June 1923	9 August 1923
4th	Limerick	James Ledden	CnaG	Death	19 January 1927	23 May 1927
6th	Carlow–Kilkenny	Peter de Loughry	CnaG	Death	23 October 1931	29 January 1932
6th	Leix–Offaly	William Aird	CnaG	Death	31 October 1931	29 January 1932
7th	Cork East	John Daly	CnaG	Death	23 February 1932	2 January 1933
7th	Waterford	William Redmond	CnaG	Death	17 April 1932	2 January 1933
7th	Donegal	Frank Carney	FF	Death	19 October 1932	2 January 1933
7th	Dublin County	Thomas Finlay	CnaG	Death	22 November 1932	2 January 1933
8th	Cork West	James Burke	FG	Death	10 September 1936	14 June 1937
8th	NUI	Conor Maguire	FF	Appointment as High Court judge	3 November 1936	14 June 1937
8th	Longford–Westmeath	James Geoghegan	FF	Appointment as Supreme Court judge	23 December 1936	14 June 1937
9th	Cork West	Eamon Rice	FF	Death	7 November 1937	27 May 1938
10th	Kilkenny	Denis Gorey	FG	Death	20 February 1940	26 June 1943
10th	Wicklow	Séamus Moore	FF	Death	14 June 1940	26 June 1943
10th	Cork South-East	Brook Brasier	FG	Death	31 August 1940	26 June 1943
10th	Mayo North	John Munnelly	FF	Death	18 October 1941	26 June 1943
10th	Cork Borough	Thomas Dowdall	FF	Death	7 April 1942	26 June 1943
10th	Dublin South	Thomas Kelly	FF	Death	20 April 1942	26 June 1943
10th	Sligo	Frank Carty	FF	Death	10 September 1942	26 June 1943
10th	Cork Borough	Hugo Flinn	FF	Death	28 January 1943	26 June 1943
10th	Cork South-East	Jeremiah Hurley	Lab	Death	2 February 1943	26 June 1943
11th	Tipperary	Martin Ryan	FF	Death	22 July 1943	30 May 1944
12th	Carlow–Kildare	James Hughes	FG	Death	1 January 1948	12 January 1948
12th	Sligo	Martin Roddy	FG	Death	8 January 1948	12 January 1948
13th	Galway West	Joseph Mongan	FG	Death	12 March 1951	7 May 1951
13th	Wexford	John Esmonde	Ind.	Resignation	1 May 1951	7 May 1951
15th	Carlow–Kilkenny	Thomas Derrig	FF	Death	19 November 1956	12 February 1957
16th	Wexford	Denis Allen	FF	Death	29 March 1961	15 September 1961
16th	Carlow–Kilkenny	Francis Humphreys	FF	Death	19 April 1961	15 September 1961
17th	Longford–Westmeath	Michael Kennedy	FF	Death	14 February 1965	18 March 1965
18th	Wexford	James Kennedy	FF	Death	13 September 1968	22 May 1969
18th	Tipperary South	Don Davern	FF	Death	2 November 1968	22 May 1969
18th	Clare	Patrick Hogan	Lab	Death	24 January 1969	22 May 1969
19th	Tipperary South	Patrick Hogan	FG	Death	5 October 1972	5 February 1973
19th	Clare	Patrick Hillery	FF	Resignation on nomination as EC Commissioner	6 January 1973	5 February 1973
20th	Dublin County South	Richard Burke	FG	Resignation on nomination as EC Commissioner	25 January 1977	25 May 1977
20th	Dublin South-West	Declan Costello	FG	Resignation on nomination as High Court judge	19 May 1977	25 May 1977
21st	Tipperary North	Michael O'Kennedy	FF	Resignation on nomination as EC Commissioner	27 January 1981	21 May 1981
22nd	Cavan–Monaghan	Kieran Doherty	AHB	Death on hunger strike	2 August 1981	27 January 1982
23rd	Clare	Bill Loughnane	FF	Death	18 October 1982	4 November 1982
24th	Donegal South-West	Cathal Coughlan	FF	Death	21 June 1986	21 January 1987
25th	Sligo–Leitrim	Ray MacSharry	FF	Resignation on nomination as EC Commissioner	25 January 1989	25 May 1989
25th	Dublin South-Central	Frank Cluskey	Lab	Death	7 May 1989	25 May 1989
30th	Dublin South	George Lee	FG	Resignation	8 February 2010	1 February 2011
30th	Waterford	Martin Cullen	FF	Resignation	24 March 2010	1 February 2011
30th	Donegal North-East	Jim McDaid	FF	Resignation	2 November 2010	1 February 2011
30th	Dublin South-Central	Seán Ardagh	FF	Resignation	28 January 2011	1 February 2011
31st	Galway West	Brian Walsh	FG	Resignation	14 January 2016	3 February 2016
32nd	Cork North-Central	Dara Murphy	FG	Resignation	3 December 2019	14 January 2020
33rd	Laois–Offaly	Barry Cowen	FF	Elected to the European Parliament	16 July 2024	8 November 2024
33rd	Carlow–Kilkenny	Kathleen Funchion	SF	Elected to the European Parliament	16 July 2024	8 November 2024
33rd	Clare	Michael McNamara	Ind.	Elected to the European Parliament	16 July 2024	8 November 2024
33rd	Dublin Bay North	Aodhán Ó Ríordáin	Lab	Elected to the European Parliament	16 July 2024	8 November 2024
33rd	Clare	Joe Carey	FG	Resignation due to illness	27 August 2024	8 November 2024

== TDs who died after the dissolution of the Dáil ==
Outgoing TDs who died after the dissolution of the Dáil but before the following election did not create a vacancy, as there was no Dáil in being at the time of their death.

Dáil	Constituency	Outgoing TD	Party	Date of dissolution	Date of death	Date of general election
6th	Leitrim–Sligo	Patrick Reynolds	Cumann na nGaedheal	29 January 1932	14 February 1932	16 February 1932
12th	Kilkenny	Eamonn Coogan	Fine Gael	12 January 1948	22 January 1948	4 February 1948

== See also ==
- List of Seanad by-elections
- List of Irish politicians who changed party affiliation
