= Members of the 2nd Dáil =

TDs from 1921 to 1922

Second Dáil
←	1st Dáil	3rd Dáil	→

Overview
- Legislative body: Dáil Éireann
- Jurisdiction: Irish Republic; Southern Ireland
- Meeting place: Royal College of Surgeons; Mansion House; UCD (Earlsfort Terrace)
- Term: 16 August 1921 – 8 June 1922
- Election: 1921 general election
- Government: 3rd Dáil ministry (Aug. 1921–Jan. 1922); 4th Dáil ministry (Jan.–Sep. 1922)
- Members: 128
- Ceann Comhairle: Eoin MacNeill
- President of Dáil Éireann: Arthur Griffith from 10 January 1922 until 12 August 1922 — Éamon de Valera until 26 August 1921
- President of the Irish Republic: Éamon de Valera from 26 August 1921 until 9 January 1922
- Chairman of the Provisional Government: W. T. Cosgrave — Michael Collins from 16 January 1922 until 22 August 1922

Sessions
- 1st: 16 August 1921 – 14 September 1921
- 2nd: 14 December 1921 – 8 June 1922

There were two elections in Ireland on 24 May 1921, following the establishment of the House of Commons of Northern Ireland and the House of Commons of Southern Ireland under the Government of Ireland Act 1920. New constituencies were established for both parliaments. A resolution of Dáil Éireann on 10 May 1921 held that these elections were to be regarded as elections to Dáil Éireann and that all those returned at these elections be regarded as members of Dáil Éireann. According to this theory of Irish republicanism, these elections provided the membership of the Second Dáil. The Second Dáil lasted 296 days.

In the election to the area designated as Northern Ireland, 52 members were elected from 9 geographic constituencies and Queen's University of Belfast. The Ulster Unionist Party (UUP) won 40 seats, while Sinn Féin and the Nationalist Party (the successor to the Irish Parliamentary Party) won six seats each; 5 of those elected for Sinn Féin were also elected for constituencies in Southern Ireland, while Nationalist Party leader Joseph Devlin was elected to two seats in Northern Ireland. On 7 June Sir James Craig, leader of the UUP, became the first Prime Minister of Northern Ireland.

In the election to the area designated as Southern Ireland, 124 Sinn Féin candidates were returned unopposed from 26 geographic constituencies and the National University constituency. The Dublin University constituency returned four Independent Unionist candidates, also unopposed. The four Independent Unionists met as the House of Commons of Southern Ireland on 28 June 1921, for one meeting only.

Those elected for Sinn Féin sat as the Second Dáil, calling themselves Teachtaí Dála (TDs). There were 125 TDs, taking into account that five represented two constituencies. The others elected did not respond to the invitation. Although the contemporaneous roll of Dáil membership included all those elected in both Northern Ireland and Southern Ireland, the database of Oireachtas members includes only those elected for Sinn Féin. For clarity on the representation of constituencies, they are presented here in a single list.

It was during the Second Dáil that the Anglo-Irish Treaty was debated, and it was approved in a Dáil vote on 7 January 1922.

On 19 May 1922, the Dáil made a resolution calling for the 1922 general election.

== Election result ==
1921 Northern Ireland general election
Party	Seats
Ulster Unionist Party	40
Sinn Féin	6
Nationalist Party (NI)	6

1921 Southern Ireland general election
Party	Seats
Sinn Féin	124
Independent Unionist	4

== Members by constituency ==
Only those elected for Sinn Féin chose to sit as TDs in the Second Dáil.

Members of the Second Dáil
Constituency	Name	Party
Antrim	Milne Barbour	UUP
Antrim	Robert Crawford	UUP
Antrim	Joseph Devlin (Note: Joseph Devlin was elected for two constituencies: Antrim and Belfast West.)	Nationalist
Antrim	John Fawcett Gordon	UUP
Antrim	George Hanna	UUP
Antrim	Robert Megaw	UUP
Antrim	Hugh O'Neill	UUP
Armagh	Richard Best	UUP
Armagh	Michael Collins (Note: Michael Collins was elected for two constituencies: Armagh and Cork Mid, North, South, South East and West.)	Sinn Féin
Armagh	John Dillon Nugent	Nationalist
Armagh	David Graham Shillington	UUP
Belfast East	Dawson Bates	UUP
Belfast East	Herbert Dixon	UUP
Belfast East	Thompson Donald	UUP
Belfast East	James Augustine Duff	UUP
Belfast North	Lloyd Campbell	UUP
Belfast North	William Grant	UUP
Belfast North	Samuel McGuffin	UUP
Belfast North	Robert McKeown	UUP
Belfast South	Crawford McCullagh	UUP
Belfast South	Julia McMordie	UUP
Belfast South	Thomas Moles	UUP
Belfast South	Hugh MacDowell Pollock	UUP
Belfast West	Thomas Henry Burn	UUP
Belfast West	Joseph Devlin	Nationalist
Belfast West	Robert Lynn	UUP
Belfast West	William J. Twaddell	UUP
Carlow–Kilkenny	Edward Aylward	Sinn Féin
Carlow–Kilkenny	W. T. Cosgrave	Sinn Féin
Carlow–Kilkenny	James Lennon	Sinn Féin
Carlow–Kilkenny	Gearóid O'Sullivan	Sinn Féin
Cavan	Arthur Griffith (Note: Arthur Griffith was elected for two constituencies: Cavan and Fermanagh & Tyrone.)	Sinn Féin
Cavan	Peter Paul Galligan	Sinn Féin
Cavan	Seán Milroy (Note: Seán Milroy was elected for two constituencies: Cavan and Fermanagh & Tyrone.)	Sinn Féin
Clare	Brian O'Higgins	Sinn Féin
Clare	Éamon de Valera (Note: Éamon de Valera was elected for two constituencies: Clare and Down.)	Sinn Féin
Clare	Seán Liddy	Sinn Féin
Clare	Patrick Brennan	Sinn Féin
Cork Borough	J. J. Walsh	Sinn Féin
Cork Borough	Liam de Róiste	Sinn Féin
Cork Borough	Mary MacSwiney	Sinn Féin
Cork Borough	Donal O'Callaghan	Sinn Féin
Cork East and North East	David Kent	Sinn Féin
Cork East and North East	Thomas Hunter	Sinn Féin
Cork East and North East	Séamus Fitzgerald	Sinn Féin
Cork Mid, North, South, South East and West	Seán MacSwiney	Sinn Féin
Cork Mid, North, South, South East and West	Patrick O'Keeffe	Sinn Féin
Cork Mid, North, South, South East and West	Michael Collins	Sinn Féin
Cork Mid, North, South, South East and West	Daniel Corkery	Sinn Féin
Cork Mid, North, South, South East and West	Seán Hales	Sinn Féin
Cork Mid, North, South, South East and West	Seán Hayes	Sinn Féin
Cork Mid, North, South, South East and West	Seán Moylan	Sinn Féin
Cork Mid, North, South, South East and West	Seán Nolan	Sinn Féin
Donegal	Joseph O'Doherty	Sinn Féin
Donegal	Peter J. Ward	Sinn Féin
Donegal	Joseph Sweeney	Sinn Féin
Donegal	Patrick McGoldrick	Sinn Féin
Donegal	Joseph McGinley	Sinn Féin
Donegal	Samuel O'Flaherty	Sinn Féin
Down	J. M. Andrews	UUP
Down	James Craig	UUP
Down	Éamon de Valera	Sinn Féin
Down	Thomas Lavery	UUP
Down	Robert McBride	UUP
Down	Thomas McMullan	UUP
Down	Harry Mulholland	UUP
Down	Patrick O'Neill	Nationalist
Dublin South	Constance Markievicz	Sinn Féin
Dublin South	Thomas Kelly	Sinn Féin
Dublin South	Daniel McCarthy	Sinn Féin
Dublin South	Cathal Ó Murchadha	Sinn Féin
Dublin County	Michael Derham	Sinn Féin
Dublin County	George Gavan Duffy	Sinn Féin
Dublin County	Séamus Dwyer	Sinn Féin
Dublin County	Desmond FitzGerald	Sinn Féin
Dublin County	Frank Lawless	Sinn Féin
Dublin County	Margaret Pearse	Sinn Féin
Dublin Mid	Seán T. O'Kelly	Sinn Féin
Dublin Mid	Philip Shanahan	Sinn Féin
Dublin Mid	Seán McGarry	Sinn Féin
Dublin Mid	Kathleen Clarke	Sinn Féin
Dublin North-West	Joseph McGrath	Sinn Féin
Dublin North-West	Michael Staines	Sinn Féin
Dublin North-West	Philip Cosgrave	Sinn Féin
Dublin North-West	Richard Mulcahy	Sinn Féin
Dublin University	Ernest Alton	Ind. Unionist
Dublin University	James Craig	Ind. Unionist
Dublin University	Gerald Fitzgibbon	Ind. Unionist
Dublin University	William Thrift	Ind. Unionist
Fermanagh and Tyrone	Edward Archdale	UUP
Fermanagh and Tyrone	James Cooper	UUP
Fermanagh and Tyrone	William Coote	UUP
Fermanagh and Tyrone	Arthur Griffith	Sinn Féin
Fermanagh and Tyrone	Thomas Harbison	Nationalist
Fermanagh and Tyrone	William Thomas Miller	UUP
Fermanagh and Tyrone	Seán Milroy	Sinn Féin
Fermanagh and Tyrone	Seán O'Mahony	Sinn Féin
Galway	Pádraic Ó Máille	Sinn Féin
Galway	Liam Mellows	Sinn Féin
Galway	Bryan Cusack	Sinn Féin
Galway	Frank Fahy	Sinn Féin
Galway	Patrick Hogan	Sinn Féin
Galway	George Nicolls	Sinn Féin
Galway	Joseph Whelehan	Sinn Féin
Kerry–Limerick West	Piaras Béaslaí	Sinn Féin
Kerry–Limerick West	Fionán Lynch	Sinn Féin
Kerry–Limerick West	Austin Stack	Sinn Féin
Kerry–Limerick West	Patrick Cahill	Sinn Féin
Kerry–Limerick West	Con Collins	Sinn Féin
Kerry–Limerick West	James Crowley	Sinn Féin
Kerry–Limerick West	Thomas O'Donoghue	Sinn Féin
Kerry–Limerick West	Edmund Roche	Sinn Féin
Kildare–Wicklow	Domhnall Ua Buachalla	Sinn Féin
Kildare–Wicklow	Robert Barton	Sinn Féin
Kildare–Wicklow	Christopher Byrne	Sinn Féin
Kildare–Wicklow	Art O'Connor	Sinn Féin
Kildare–Wicklow	Erskine Childers	Sinn Féin
Leitrim–Roscommon North	Thomas Carter	Sinn Féin
Leitrim–Roscommon North	James Dolan	Sinn Féin
Leitrim–Roscommon North	Andrew Lavin	Sinn Féin
Leitrim–Roscommon North	George Noble Plunkett	Sinn Féin
Leix–Offaly	Patrick McCartan	Sinn Féin
Leix–Offaly	Joseph Lynch	Sinn Féin
Leix–Offaly	Francis Bulfin	Sinn Féin
Leix–Offaly	Kevin O'Higgins	Sinn Féin
Limerick City–Limerick East	Michael Colivet	Sinn Féin
Limerick City–Limerick East	Richard Hayes	Sinn Féin
Limerick City–Limerick East	William Hayes	Sinn Féin
Limerick City–Limerick East	Kathleen O'Callaghan	Sinn Féin
Londonderry	Robert Newton Anderson	UUP
Londonderry	Dehra Chichester	UUP
Londonderry	George Leeke	Nationalist
Londonderry	Eoin MacNeill (Note: Eoin MacNeill was elected for two constituencies: Londonderry and National University of Ireland.)	Sinn Féin
Londonderry	John Martin Mark	UUP
Longford–Westmeath	Joseph McGuinness	Sinn Féin
Longford–Westmeath	Lorcan Robbins	Sinn Féin
Longford–Westmeath	Seán Mac Eoin	Sinn Féin
Longford–Westmeath	Laurence Ginnell	Sinn Féin
Louth–Meath	John J. O'Kelly	Sinn Féin
Louth–Meath	James Murphy	Sinn Féin
Louth–Meath	Justin McKenna	Sinn Féin
Louth–Meath	Peter Hughes	Sinn Féin
Louth–Meath	Eamonn Duggan	Sinn Féin
Mayo North and West	John Crowley	Sinn Féin
Mayo North and West	Thomas Derrig	Sinn Féin
Mayo North and West	Joseph MacBride	Sinn Féin
Mayo North and West	P. J. Ruttledge	Sinn Féin
Mayo South–Roscommon South	William Sears	Sinn Féin
Mayo South–Roscommon South	Tom Maguire	Sinn Féin
Mayo South–Roscommon South	Daniel O'Rourke	Sinn Féin
Mayo South–Roscommon South	Harry Boland	Sinn Féin
Monaghan	Ernest Blythe	Sinn Féin
Monaghan	Seán MacEntee	Sinn Féin
Monaghan	Eoin O'Duffy	Sinn Féin
National University	Eoin MacNeill	Sinn Féin
National University	Ada English	Sinn Féin
National University	Michael Hayes	Sinn Féin
National University	William Stockley	Sinn Féin
Queen's University of Belfast	John Campbell	UUP
Queen's University of Belfast	Robert James Johnstone	UUP
Queen's University of Belfast	Hugh Morrison	UUP
Queen's University of Belfast	John Hanna Robb	UUP
Sligo–Mayo East	Frank Carty	Sinn Féin
Sligo–Mayo East	Alexander McCabe	Sinn Féin
Sligo–Mayo East	James Devins	Sinn Féin
Sligo–Mayo East	Francis Ferran	Sinn Féin
Sligo–Mayo East	Thomas O'Donnell	Sinn Féin
Tipperary Mid, North and South	Séamus Burke	Sinn Féin
Tipperary Mid, North and South	Joseph MacDonagh	Sinn Féin
Tipperary Mid, North and South	P. J. Moloney	Sinn Féin
Tipperary Mid, North and South	Patrick O'Byrne	Sinn Féin
Waterford–Tipperary East	Cathal Brugha	Sinn Féin
Waterford–Tipperary East	Eamon Dee	Sinn Féin
Waterford–Tipperary East	Frank Drohan	Sinn Féin
Waterford–Tipperary East	Séumas Robinson	Sinn Féin
Waterford–Tipperary East	Vincent White	Sinn Féin
Wexford	James Ryan	Sinn Féin
Wexford	Seán Etchingham	Sinn Féin
Wexford	Richard Corish	Sinn Féin
Wexford	Séamus Doyle	Sinn Féin

== Vacancies ==
Constituency	Outgoing TD	Party	Reason for vacancy	Date of vacancy
Waterford–Tipperary East	Frank Drohan	Sinn Féin (Anti-Treaty)	Resignation	5 January 1922
Dublin County	Frank Lawless	Sinn Féin (Pro-Treaty)	Death	16 April 1922
Longford–Westmeath	Joseph McGuinness	Sinn Féin (Pro-Treaty)	Death	31 May 1922
