= List of members of Dáil Éireann who died in office =

TDs who died in office

The following is a list of members of Dáil Éireann (Teachtaí Dála or TDs) who died in office.

Dáil	Member	Party	Constituency	Date of death	Age at death (years)	Cause
1st	Pierce McCan	Sinn Féin	Tipperary East	6 March 1919	36	Spanish flu
1st	Terence MacSwiney	Sinn Féin	Cork Mid	25 October 1920	41	Hunger strike in prison during the Irish War of Independence
2nd	Frank Lawless	Sinn Féin (Pro-Treaty)	Dublin County	16 April 1922	51	Carriage accident
2nd	Joseph McGuinness	Sinn Féin (Pro-Treaty)	Longford–Westmeath	31 May 1922	47	
3rd	Cathal Brugha	Sinn Féin (Anti-Treaty)	Waterford–Tipperary East	7 July 1922	47	Killed in action during the Irish Civil War
3rd	Harry Boland	Sinn Féin (Anti-Treaty)	Mayo South–Roscommon South	1 August 1922	35	Killed in action during the Irish Civil War
3rd	Arthur Griffith	Sinn Féin (Pro-Treaty)	Cavan	12 August 1922	51	Cerebral hemorrhage, heart failure
3rd	Michael Collins	Sinn Féin (Pro-Treaty)	Cork Mid, North, South, South East and West	22 August 1922	31	Assassinated – shot by the Anti-Treaty IRA during the Irish Civil War
3rd	James Devins	Sinn Féin (Anti-Treaty)	Sligo–Mayo East	20 September 1922	48	Executed by Pro-Treaty forces during the Irish Civil War
3rd	Seán Hales	Sinn Féin (Pro-Treaty)	Cork Mid, North, South, South East and West	7 December 1922	42	Assassinated – shot by the Anti-Treaty IRA during the Irish Civil War
3rd	Joseph MacDonagh	Sinn Féin (Anti-Treaty)	Tipperary Mid, North and South	25 December 1922	39	Burst appendix during a hunger strike against the Anglo-Irish Treaty
3rd	Francis Ferran	Sinn Féin (Anti-Treaty)	Sligo–Mayo East	10 June 1923		Died in prison
4th	Philip Cosgrave	Cumann na nGaedheal	Dublin South	22 October 1923	38	Nephritis
4th	Michael Derham	Cumann na nGaedheal	Dublin County	20 November 1923	33	
4th	Thomas O'Mahony	Cumann na nGaedheal	Cork East	20 July 1924		
4th	Darrell Figgis	Independent	Dublin County	27 October 1925	43	Suicide
4th	James Ledden	Cumann na nGaedheal	Limerick	19 January 1927		
5th	Kevin O'Higgins	Cumann na nGaedheal	Dublin County	10 July 1927	35	Assassinated – shot by the IRA
5th	Constance Markievicz	Fianna Fáil	Dublin South	15 July 1927	59	Complications from an appendicitis operation
6th	Samuel Holt	Fianna Fáil	Leitrim–Sligo	18 April 1929	48	Fever
6th	James Killane	Fianna Fáil	Longford–Westmeath	26 April 1930	55	
6th	Bryan Cooper	Cumann na nGaedheal	Dublin County	5 July 1930	46	
6th	Hugh Colohan	Labour	Kildare	15 April 1931	60–61	
6th	Peter de Loughry	Cumann na nGaedheal	Carlow–Kilkenny	23 October 1931	47–48	
6th	William Aird	Cumann na nGaedheal	Leix–Offaly	31 October 1931	38–39	
7th	John Daly	Cumann na nGaedheal	Cork East	23 February 1932	64	
7th	William Redmond	Cumann na nGaedheal	Waterford	17 April 1932	45	
7th	Frank Carney	Fianna Fáil	Donegal	19 October 1932	36	
7th	Thomas Finlay	Cumann na nGaedheal	Dublin County	22 November 1932	39	Typhoid fever
8th	James Craig	Independent	Dublin University	12 July 1933	71	
8th	Martin McDonogh	Fine Gael	Galway	24 November 1934	75–76	
8th	Batt O'Connor	Fine Gael	Dublin County	7 February 1935	64	
8th	Patrick Hogan	Fine Gael	Galway	14 July 1936	45	Car accident
8th	Sir Osmond Esmonde	Fine Gael	Wexford	22 July 1936	40	
8th	James Burke	Fine Gael	Cork West	10 September 1936	62–63	
9th	Eamon Rice	Fianna Fáil	Monaghan	7 November 1937	64	
10th	James Beckett	Fine Gael	Dublin South	19 December 1938	63	
10th	Seán Tubridy	Fianna Fáil	Galway West	15 July 1939	41–42	
10th	Denis Gorey	Fine Gael	Kilkenny	20 February 1940	65	
10th	Séamus Moore	Fianna Fáil	Wicklow	14 June 1940		
10th	Brook Brasier	Fine Gael	Cork South-East	30 August 1940	61	
10th	John Munnelly	Fianna Fáil	Mayo North	18 October 1941		
10th	Thomas Dowdall	Fianna Fáil	Cork Borough	7 April 1942	69–70	
10th	Thomas Kelly	Fianna Fáil	Dublin South	20 April 1942	73	
10th	Frank Carty	Fianna Fáil	Sligo	10 September 1942	45	
10th	Hugo Flinn	Fianna Fáil	Cork Borough	28 January 1943	63	
10th	Jeremiah Hurley	Labour	Cork South-East	2 February 1943	51–52	
12th	Patrick Burke	Fine Gael	Clare	7 February 1945	65	
12th	Frederick Crowley	Fianna Fáil	Kerry South	5 May 1945	54	
12th	Richard Corish	Labour	Wexford	19 July 1945	58	
12th	William O'Donnell	Clann na Talmhan	Tipperary	4 February 1947		
12th	Patrick Fogarty	Fianna Fáil	Dublin County	2 May 1947		
12th	Michael Morrissey	Fianna Fáil	Waterford	10 May 1947		
12th	James Hughes	Fine Gael	Carlow–Kildare	1 January 1948	52–53	
12th	Martin Roddy	Fine Gael	Sligo	8 January 1948	64	
13th	Neal Blaney	Fianna Fáil	Donegal East	30 October 1948	58	Cancer
13th	Timothy J. Murphy	Labour	Cork West	29 April 1949	55	
13th	Brian Brady	Fianna Fáil	Donegal West	10 September 1949	46	
13th	Joseph Mongan	Fine Gael	Galway West	12 March 1951	71	
14th	Daniel Bourke	Fianna Fáil	Limerick East	13 April 1952	65–66	
14th	Bridget Redmond	Fine Gael	Waterford	3 May 1952	47	
14th	P. J. Ruttledge	Fianna Fáil	Mayo North	8 May 1952	60	
14th	A. P. Byrne	Independent	Dublin North-West	26 July 1952	39	
14th	Thomas Brennan	Fianna Fáil	Wicklow	22 January 1953	66–67	
14th	Seán Keane	Labour	Cork East	29 March 1953	53	
14th	Frank Fahy	Fianna Fáil	Galway South	12 July 1953	73	
14th	Thomas F. O'Higgins	Fine Gael	Cork Borough	1 November 1953	62	
14th	James Coburn	Fine Gael	Louth	5 December 1953	71	
15th	David Madden	Fine Gael	Limerick West	31 July 1955	74–75	
15th	Johnny Connor	Clann na Poblachta	Kerry North	11 December 1955	56	Road accident
15th	William Davin	Labour	Leix–Offaly	1 March 1956	66	
15th	Alfie Byrne	Independent	Dublin North-East	13 March 1956	73	
15th	Patrick McGrath	Fianna Fáil	Cork Borough	20 June 1956		
15th	Thomas Walsh	Fianna Fáil	Carlow–Kilkenny	14 July 1956	54	Road accident
15th	Peadar Doyle	Fine Gael	Dublin South-West	4 August 1956		
16th	Colm Gallagher	Fianna Fáil	Dublin North-Central	26 June 1957		
16th	Patrick Beegan	Fianna Fáil	Galway South	2 February 1958	62	
16th	Bernard Butler	Fianna Fáil	Dublin South-West	13 March 1959	72	
16th	James Griffin	Fianna Fáil	Meath	22 March 1959	59	
16th	Joseph Hughes	Fine Gael	Carlow–Kilkenny	20 January 1960	54	
16th	Stephen Flynn	Fianna Fáil	Sligo–Leitrim	24 November 1960		
16th	Denis Allen	Fianna Fáil	Wexford	29 March 1961	65	
16th	Francis Humphreys	Fianna Fáil	Carlow–Kilkenny	19 April 1961	69	
17th	Jack Belton	Fine Gael	Dublin North-East	23 February 1963		
17th	John Galvin	Fianna Fáil	Cork Borough	11 October 1963	56	
17th	William Norton	Labour	Kildare	4 December 1963	63	
17th	James Burke	Fine Gael	Roscommon	12 May 1964		
17th	Michael Donnellan	Clann na Talmhan	Galway East	27 September 1964	63–64	
17th	Dan Desmond	Labour	Cork Mid	9 December 1964	51	Heart attack caused by tuberculosis
18th	Honor Crowley	Fianna Fáil	Kerry South	18 October 1966	62	
18th	Thaddeus Lynch	Fine Gael	Waterford	25 October 1966	64–65	
18th	Seán Casey	Labour	Cork Borough	29 April 1967	44	
18th	James Collins	Fianna Fáil	Limerick West	1 September 1967	66	
18th	William Murphy	Fine Gael	Clare	16 November 1967	75	
18th	James Everett	Labour	Wicklow	18 December 1967	77	
18th	Donogh O'Malley	Fianna Fáil	Limerick East	10 March 1968	47	
18th	James Kennedy	Fianna Fáil	Wexford	13 September 1968	59	
18th	Don Davern	Fianna Fáil	Tipperary South	2 November 1968	33	
18th	Patrick Hogan	Labour	Clare	24 January 1969	83	
19th	Seán Dunne	Labour	Dublin South-West	25 June 1969	50	
19th	Gerard Sweetman	Fine Gael	Kildare	28 January 1970	61	Road accident
19th	Patrick Lenihan	Fianna Fáil	Longford–Westmeath	11 March 1970	67	
19th	Patrick O'Donnell	Fine Gael	Donegal–Leitrim	4 October 1970	63	
19th	Paddy Forde	Fianna Fáil	Cork Mid	13 May 1972	49	
19th	Patrick Hogan	Fine Gael	Tipperary South	5 October 1972	65	
20th	Liam Ahern	Fianna Fáil	Cork North-East	13 July 1974	58	
20th	Michael F. Kitt	Fianna Fáil	Galway North-East	24 December 1974	60	
20th	Johnny Geoghegan	Fianna Fáil	Galway West	5 January 1975	61	
20th	Henry Kenny	Fine Gael	Mayo West	25 September 1975	62	Cancer
20th	Liam Cunningham	Fianna Fáil	Donegal North-East	29 February 1976	61	
20th	Noel Lemass	Fianna Fáil	Dublin South-West	13 April 1976	47	
21st	Seán Brosnan	Fianna Fáil	Cork North-East	18 April 1979	62	
21st	Patrick Kerrigan	Labour	Cork City	4 July 1979	51	
21st	Joseph Brennan	Fianna Fáil (serving as Ceann Comhairle)	Donegal	13 July 1980	67	
22nd	Kieran Doherty	Anti H-Block	Cavan–Monaghan	2 August 1981	25	Hunger strike in prison during the Troubles
23rd	Johnny Callanan	Fianna Fáil	Galway East	15 June 1982	72	
23rd	Bill Loughnane	Fianna Fáil	Clare	18 October 1982	67	
24th	Clement Coughlan	Fianna Fáil	Donegal South-West	1 February 1983	40	Road accident
24th	George Colley	Fianna Fáil	Dublin Central	17 September 1983	57	Heart disease
24th	Bernard Cowen	Fianna Fáil	Laois–Offaly	24 January 1984	51	
24th	Cathal Coughlan	Fianna Fáil	Donegal South-West	21 June 1986	48	
25th	Frank Cluskey	Labour	Dublin South-Central	7 May 1989	59	Cancer
27th	Gerry O'Sullivan	Labour	Cork North-Central	5 August 1994	58	
27th	Johnny Fox	Independent	Wicklow	17 March 1995	46	
27th	Brian Lenihan Snr	Fianna Fáil	Dublin West	1 November 1995	64	
27th	Neil Blaney	Independent Fianna Fáil	Donegal North-East	8 November 1995	73	Cancer
28th	Jim Kemmy	Labour	Limerick East	25 September 1997	61	Multiple myeloma
28th	Hugh Coveney	Fine Gael	Cork South-Central	14 March 1998	62	Fall from a cliff
28th	Pat Upton	Labour	Dublin South-Central	22 February 1999	54	Heart attack
28th	Michael Ferris	Labour	Tipperary South	20 March 2000	68	
28th	Theresa Ahearn	Fine Gael	Tipperary South	20 September 2000	49	Cancer
30th	Séamus Brennan	Fianna Fáil	Dublin South	9 July 2008	60	Cancer
30th	Tony Gregory	Independent	Dublin Central	2 January 2009	61	Cancer
31st	Brian Lenihan Jnr	Fianna Fáil	Dublin West	10 June 2011	52	Pancreatic cancer
31st	Shane McEntee	Fine Gael	Meath East	21 December 2012	56	Suicide
31st	Nicky McFadden	Fine Gael	Longford–Westmeath	25 March 2014	51	Motor neurone disease

== See also ==
- List of members of Seanad Éireann who died in office
- List of Dáil by-elections
