= Members of the 3rd Dáil =

TDs from 1922 to 1923

3rd Dáil
←	2nd Dáil	4th Dáil	→

Overview
- Legislative body: Dáil Éireann
- Jurisdiction: Irish Republic; Southern Ireland; Irish Free State
- Meeting place: UCD (Earlsfort Terrace); Leinster House
- Term: 9 September 1922 – 9 August 1923
- Election: 1922 general election
- Government: 2nd provisional government and 5th ministry (until 6 December 1922); 1st executive council (from 6 December 1922)
- Members: 128
- Ceann Comhairle: Michael Hayes
- President of Dáil Éireann: W. T. Cosgrave until 6 December 1922
- Chairman of the Provisional Government: W. T. Cosgrave until 6 December 1922
- President of the Executive Council: W. T. Cosgrave from 6 December 1922
- Vice-President of the Executive Council: Kevin O'Higgins from 6 December 1922
- Chief Whip: Daniel McCarthy from 6 December 1922
- Leader of the Opposition: Thomas Johnson

Sessions
- 1st: 9 September 1922 – 9 August 1923

The 3rd Dáil was elected at the 1922 general election on 16 June and met on 9 September. On its formation, it was a Constituent Assembly in a Provisional Parliament. From 6 December 1922, Dáil Éireann was one of two houses of the Oireachtas in the Irish Free State, sitting with the First Seanad constituted as the 1922 Seanad. Members of the Dáil are known as TDs. The 3rd Dáil was dissolved by Governor-General Tim Healy on 9 August 1923, at the request of the President of the Executive Council W. T. Cosgrave. The 3rd Dáil lasted 334 days.

== Composition of the 3rd Dáil ==
- 2nd provisional government, 1st Executive Council

Party	June 1922	Aug. 1923	Change
Sinn Féin (Pro-Treaty) (Note: Cumann na nGaedheal was formed in April 1923 by the members of the Pro-Treaty faction of Sinn Féin.)	58	—N/a	▼58 ▼51 ▼7 (Note: Before the formation of Cumann na nGaedheal, the group had seven losses: 3 from deaths, 3 from resignations, and 1 due to becoming the Ceann Comhairle.)
Sinn Féin (Anti-Treaty)	36	30	▼6
Labour	17	16	▼1
Farmers' Party	7	7	Steady
Businessmen's Party	1	1	Steady
Cumann na nGaedheal	—N/a	51	▲51
Independent	9	10	▲1
Ceann Comhairle	—N/a	1	▲1
Vacant	—N/a	12	▲12 (Note: There were a high number of vacancies as no by-elections were held to fill the seats.)
Total	128		

Opposed to the Free State, the Anti-Treaty TDs did not take their seats. This made a functional majority of only 46 seats and left Labour as the main opposition party.

Pro-Treaty Sinn Féin formed a Dáil ministry when the 3rd Dáil met on 9 September 1922. On 6 December 1922, the Irish Free State came into being, and on that date, Pro-Treaty Sinn Féin formed the 1st executive council of the Irish Free State, led by W. T. Cosgrave as President of the Executive Council. It formed the Cumann na nGaedheal party in April 1923.

=== Graphical representation ===
This is a graphical comparison of party strengths in the 3rd Dáil from June 1922. This was not an official seating plan.

- Sinn Féin (Pro-Treaty) is shown on the right.
- Sinn Féin (Anti-Treaty) is shown on the left, though they did not take their seats.

== Ceann Comhairle ==
On 9 September 1922, Michael Hayes (SF) was proposed by Ernest Blythe (SF) and seconded by Patrick Hogan (SF) for the position of Ceann Comhairle, and was approved without a vote. Pádraic Ó Máille (SF) was proposed by Piaras Béaslaí (SF) and seconded by Liam de Róiste (SF) for the position of Leas-Cheann Comhairle, and also approved without a vote.

On 6 December 1922, when the Dáil first met under the new constitution, Hayes was proposed by W. T. Cosgrave (SF) and seconded by Thomas Johnson (Lab) for the position of Ceann Comhairle, and was approved without a vote. Ó Máille was proposed as Leas-Cheann Comhairle by George Nicolls (SF) and seconded by Seán McGarry (SF), and also approved without a vote.

== Oath ==
The Ceann Comhairle administered the Oath of Allegiance as required under Article 17 of the Constitution of the Irish Free State on 6 December 1922. Thomas Johnson, leader of the Labour Party, read a statement on behalf of the party's representatives explaining the context of their taking the oath.

== TDs by constituency ==
The list of the 128 TDs elected is given in alphabetical order by Dáil constituency.

Members of the 3rd Dáil
Constituency	Name	Party
Carlow–Kilkenny	W. T. Cosgrave	Sinn Féin (Pro-Treaty)
Carlow–Kilkenny	Patrick Gaffney	Labour
Carlow–Kilkenny	Denis Gorey	Farmers' Party
Carlow–Kilkenny	Gearóid O'Sullivan	Sinn Féin (Pro-Treaty)
Cavan	Walter L. Cole	Sinn Féin (Pro-Treaty)
Cavan	Arthur Griffith	Sinn Féin (Pro-Treaty)
Cavan	Seán Milroy	Sinn Féin (Pro-Treaty)
Clare	Patrick Brennan	Sinn Féin (Pro-Treaty)
Clare	Éamon de Valera	Sinn Féin (Anti-Treaty)
Clare	Seán Liddy	Sinn Féin (Pro-Treaty)
Clare	Brian O'Higgins	Sinn Féin (Anti-Treaty)
Cork Borough	Robert Day	Labour
Cork Borough	Liam de Róiste	Sinn Féin (Pro-Treaty)
Cork Borough	Mary MacSwiney	Sinn Féin (Anti-Treaty)
Cork Borough	J. J. Walsh	Sinn Féin (Pro-Treaty)
Cork East and North East	John Dinneen	Farmers' Party
Cork East and North East	Michael Hennessy	Businessmen's Party
Cork East and North East	David Kent	Sinn Féin (Anti-Treaty)
Cork Mid, North, South, South East and West	Michael Bradley	Labour
Cork Mid, North, South, South East and West	Michael Collins	Sinn Féin (Pro-Treaty)
Cork Mid, North, South, South East and West	Daniel Corkery	Sinn Féin (Anti-Treaty)
Cork Mid, North, South, South East and West	Seán Hales	Sinn Féin (Pro-Treaty)
Cork Mid, North, South, South East and West	Seán Hayes	Sinn Féin (Pro-Treaty)
Cork Mid, North, South, South East and West	Seán Moylan	Sinn Féin (Anti-Treaty)
Cork Mid, North, South, South East and West	Thomas Nagle	Labour
Cork Mid, North, South, South East and West	Daniel Vaughan	Farmers' Party
Donegal	Joseph McGinley	Sinn Féin (Pro-Treaty)
Donegal	Patrick McGoldrick	Sinn Féin (Pro-Treaty)
Donegal	Joseph O'Doherty	Sinn Féin (Anti-Treaty)
Donegal	Samuel O'Flaherty	Sinn Féin (Anti-Treaty)
Donegal	Joseph Sweeney	Sinn Féin (Pro-Treaty)
Donegal	Peter Ward	Sinn Féin (Pro-Treaty)
Dublin South	Thomas Kelly	Sinn Féin (Pro-Treaty)
Dublin South	Myles Keogh	Independent
Dublin South	Daniel McCarthy	Sinn Féin (Pro-Treaty)
Dublin South	William O'Brien	Labour
Dublin County	Michael Derham	Sinn Féin (Pro-Treaty)
Dublin County	George Gavan Duffy	Sinn Féin (Pro-Treaty)
Dublin County	Darrell Figgis	Independent
Dublin County	Desmond FitzGerald	Sinn Féin (Pro-Treaty)
Dublin County	Thomas Johnson	Labour
Dublin County	John Rooney	Farmers' Party
Dublin Mid	Alfie Byrne	Independent
Dublin Mid	Seán McGarry	Sinn Féin (Pro-Treaty)
Dublin Mid	Seán T. O'Kelly	Sinn Féin (Anti-Treaty)
Dublin Mid	Laurence O'Neill	Independent
Dublin North-West	Philip Cosgrave	Sinn Féin (Pro-Treaty)
Dublin North-West	Joseph McGrath	Sinn Féin (Pro-Treaty)
Dublin North-West	Richard Mulcahy	Sinn Féin (Pro-Treaty)
Dublin North-West	Michael Staines	Sinn Féin (Pro-Treaty)
Dublin University	Ernest Alton	Independent
Dublin University	James Craig	Independent
Dublin University	Gerald Fitzgibbon	Independent
Dublin University	William Thrift	Independent
Galway	Bryan Cusack	Sinn Féin (Anti-Treaty)
Galway	Frank Fahy	Sinn Féin (Anti-Treaty)
Galway	Patrick Hogan	Sinn Féin (Pro-Treaty)
Galway	George Nicolls	Sinn Féin (Pro-Treaty)
Galway	Pádraic Ó Máille	Sinn Féin (Pro-Treaty)
Galway	Thomas J. O'Connell	Labour
Galway	Joseph Whelehan	Sinn Féin (Pro-Treaty)
Kerry–Limerick West	Piaras Béaslaí	Sinn Féin (Pro-Treaty)
Kerry–Limerick West	Patrick Cahill	Sinn Féin (Anti-Treaty)
Kerry–Limerick West	Con Collins	Sinn Féin (Anti-Treaty)
Kerry–Limerick West	James Crowley	Sinn Féin (Pro-Treaty)
Kerry–Limerick West	Fionán Lynch	Sinn Féin (Pro-Treaty)
Kerry–Limerick West	Thomas O'Donoghue	Sinn Féin (Anti-Treaty)
Kerry–Limerick West	Edmund Roche	Sinn Féin (Anti-Treaty)
Kerry–Limerick West	Austin Stack	Sinn Féin (Anti-Treaty)
Kildare–Wicklow	Robert Barton	Sinn Féin (Anti-Treaty)
Kildare–Wicklow	Christopher Byrne	Sinn Féin (Pro-Treaty)
Kildare–Wicklow	Hugh Colohan	Labour
Kildare–Wicklow	James Everett	Labour
Kildare–Wicklow	Richard Wilson	Farmers' Party
Leitrim–Roscommon North	Thomas Carter	Sinn Féin (Pro-Treaty)
Leitrim–Roscommon North	James Dolan	Sinn Féin (Pro-Treaty)
Leitrim–Roscommon North	Andrew Lavin	Sinn Féin (Pro-Treaty)
Leitrim–Roscommon North	George Noble Plunkett	Sinn Féin (Anti-Treaty)
Leix–Offaly	Francis Bulfin	Sinn Féin (Pro-Treaty)
Leix–Offaly	William Davin	Labour
Leix–Offaly	Patrick McCartan	Sinn Féin (Pro-Treaty)
Leix–Offaly	Kevin O'Higgins	Sinn Féin (Pro-Treaty)
Limerick City–Limerick East	Michael Colivet	Sinn Féin (Anti-Treaty)
Limerick City–Limerick East	Richard Hayes	Sinn Féin (Pro-Treaty)
Limerick City–Limerick East	William Hayes	Sinn Féin (Pro-Treaty)
Limerick City–Limerick East	Kathleen O'Callaghan	Sinn Féin (Anti-Treaty)
Longford–Westmeath	Laurence Ginnell	Sinn Féin (Anti-Treaty)
Longford–Westmeath	John Lyons	Labour
Longford–Westmeath	Seán Mac Eoin	Sinn Féin (Pro-Treaty)
Longford–Westmeath	Francis McGuinness	Sinn Féin (Pro-Treaty)
Louth–Meath	Eamonn Duggan	Sinn Féin (Pro-Treaty)
Louth–Meath	Peter Hughes	Sinn Féin (Pro-Treaty)
Louth–Meath	James Murphy	Sinn Féin (Pro-Treaty)
Louth–Meath	John J. O'Kelly	Sinn Féin (Anti-Treaty)
Louth–Meath	Cathal O'Shannon	Labour
Mayo North and West	John Crowley	Sinn Féin (Anti-Treaty)
Mayo North and West	Thomas Derrig	Sinn Féin (Anti-Treaty)
Mayo North and West	Joseph MacBride	Sinn Féin (Pro-Treaty)
Mayo North and West	P. J. Ruttledge	Sinn Féin (Anti-Treaty)
Mayo South–Roscommon South	Harry Boland	Sinn Féin (Anti-Treaty)
Mayo South–Roscommon South	Tom Maguire	Sinn Féin (Anti-Treaty)
Mayo South–Roscommon South	Daniel O'Rourke	Sinn Féin (Pro-Treaty)
Mayo South–Roscommon South	William Sears	Sinn Féin (Pro-Treaty)
Monaghan	Ernest Blythe	Sinn Féin (Pro-Treaty)
Monaghan	Patrick MacCarvill	Sinn Féin (Anti-Treaty)
Monaghan	Eoin O'Duffy	Sinn Féin (Pro-Treaty)
National University	Michael Hayes	Sinn Féin (Pro-Treaty)
National University	Eoin MacNeill	Sinn Féin (Pro-Treaty)
National University	William Magennis	Independent
National University	William Stockley	Sinn Féin (Anti-Treaty)
Sligo–Mayo East	Frank Carty	Sinn Féin (Anti-Treaty)
Sligo–Mayo East	James Devins	Sinn Féin (Anti-Treaty)
Sligo–Mayo East	Francis Ferran	Sinn Féin (Anti-Treaty)
Sligo–Mayo East	Alexander McCabe	Sinn Féin (Pro-Treaty)
Sligo–Mayo East	Thomas O'Donnell	Sinn Féin (Pro-Treaty)
Tipperary Mid, North and South	Séamus Burke	Sinn Féin (Pro-Treaty)
Tipperary Mid, North and South	Joseph MacDonagh	Sinn Féin (Anti-Treaty)
Tipperary Mid, North and South	P. J. Moloney	Sinn Féin (Anti-Treaty)
Tipperary Mid, North and South	Daniel Morrissey	Labour
Waterford–Tipperary East	Cathal Brugha	Sinn Féin (Anti-Treaty)
Waterford–Tipperary East	John Butler	Labour
Waterford–Tipperary East	Daniel Byrne	Farmers' Party
Waterford–Tipperary East	Nicholas Phelan	Labour
Waterford–Tipperary East	Vincent White	Sinn Féin (Pro-Treaty)
Wexford	Richard Corish	Labour
Wexford	Michael Doyle	Farmers' Party
Wexford	Séamus Doyle	Sinn Féin (Anti-Treaty)
Wexford	Daniel O'Callaghan	Labour

== Changes ==
No by-elections were held for vacancies during the 3rd Dáil.

Date	Constituency	Loss	Gain	Note
7 July 1922	Waterford–Tipperary East	Sinn Féin (Anti-Treaty)		Death of Cathal Brugha
1 August 1922	Mayo South–Roscommon South	Sinn Féin (Anti-Treaty)		Death of Harry Boland
12 August 1922	Cavan	Sinn Féin (Pro-Treaty)		Death of Arthur Griffith
22 August 1922	Cork Mid, North, South, South East and West	Sinn Féin (Pro-Treaty)		Death of Michael Collins
9 September 1922	National University	Sinn Féin (Pro-Treaty)	Ceann Comhairle	Michael Hayes takes office as Ceann Comhairle
20 September 1922	Sligo–Mayo East	Sinn Féin (Anti-Treaty)		Death of James Devins
29 November 1922	Mayo South–Roscommon South	Sinn Féin (Pro-Treaty)		Resignation of Daniel O'Rourke
6 December 1922	Carlow–Kilkenny	Labour	Independent Labour	Patrick Gaffney refused to take the Oath
7 December 1922	Cork Mid, North, South, South East and West	Sinn Féin (Pro-Treaty)		Death of Seán Hales
13 December 1922	Clare	Sinn Féin (Pro-Treaty)		Resignation of Patrick Brennan
18 December 1922	Clare	Sinn Féin (Pro-Treaty)		Resignation of Seán Liddy
25 December 1922	Tipperary Mid, North and South	Sinn Féin (Anti-Treaty)		Death of Joseph MacDonagh
17 April 1923	Longford–Westmeath	Sinn Féin (Anti-Treaty)		Death of Laurence Ginnell
27 April 1923		Sinn Féin (Pro-Treaty)	Cumann na nGaedheal	Formation of new party
10 June 1923	Sligo–Mayo East	Sinn Féin (Anti-Treaty)		Death of Francis Ferran
