= Anglo-Irish Treaty Dáil vote =

1922 Anglo-Irish Treaty vote

The Anglo-Irish Treaty was signed in London on 6 December 1921 and Dáil Éireann voted to approve the treaty on 7 January 1922, following a debate through late December 1921 and into January 1922. The vote was 64 in favour, 57 against, with the Ceann Comhairle and 3 others not voting. The Sinn Féin party split into opposing sides in the aftermath of the Treaty vote, which led to the Irish Civil War from June 1922 to May 1923.

== Background ==
Two elections took place in Ireland in 1921, as a result of the Government of Ireland Act 1920 to establish the House of Commons of Northern Ireland and the House of Commons of Southern Ireland. The election was used by the Irish Republic as the basis of membership of the Second Dáil. The general election to the Northern Ireland House of Commons occurred on 24 May. Of 52 seats, forty were won by unionists, six by moderate Irish nationalists and six by Sinn Féin. No actual polling took place in the Southern Ireland constituencies, as all 128 candidates were returned unopposed. Given the backdrop of the increasingly violent War of Independence, any candidates opposed to Sinn Féin and their supporters could expect to be harassed by the Irish Republican Army (IRA). Supporters of the Labour Party stood aside to allow the constitutional situation to run its course. Of these 128, 124 were won by Sinn Féin, and four by independent unionists representing Dublin University.

Only the Sinn Féin candidates recognised the Second Dáil and five of these had been elected in two constituencies, one in each part of Ireland, so the total number of members who assembled in the Second Dáil was 125.

During the Second Dáil, the government of the Irish Republic and the British government of David Lloyd George agreed to hold peace negotiations. On 14 September 1921 the Dáil ratified the appointment of Arthur Griffith, Michael Collins, Robert Barton, Eamonn Duggan and George Gavan Duffy as envoys plenipotentiary for the peace conference in England. These envoys eventually signed the Anglo-Irish Treaty on 6 December. After almost a month of acrimonious debate the treaty was formally ratified by Dáil Éireann on 7 January 1922.

== Vote ==
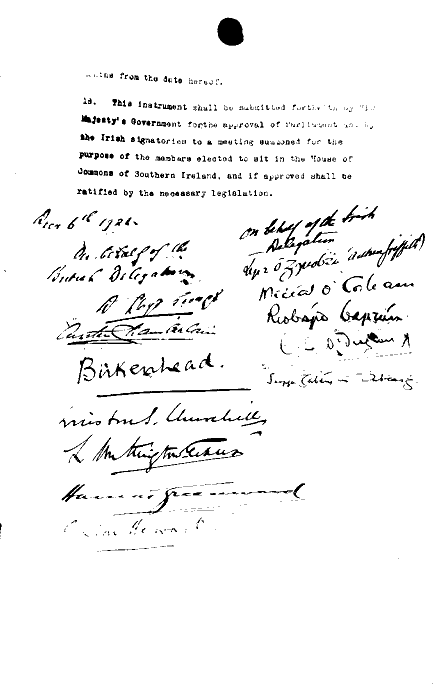
The Treaty signature page

7 January 1922; Anglo-Irish Treaty Dáil vote Absolute majority: 63/124
Vote	Votes
Yes	64 / 124
No	57 / 124
Absent	3 / 124

The Ceann Comhairle Eoin MacNeill absented himself from the vote in accordance with standing orders. It was ruled that the four other TDs, Michael Collins, Arthur Griffith, Éamon de Valera and Seán Milroy, who had been elected for two constituencies (for both the House of Commons of Southern Ireland and the House of Commons of Northern Ireland) would only cast one vote each. Of the 124 Teachtaí Dála (TDs) who were entitled to vote as a result of these rulings, 121 cast their vote in the Dáil, and three abstained. The result of the vote was: 64 in favour of the Treaty and 57 against. Three TDs eligible to vote did not do so:

- Frank Drohan resigned his seat on 5 January 1922, because he was personally anti-Treaty while his local Sinn Féin branch was pro-Treaty.
- Laurence Ginnell (anti-Treaty) was absent in Argentina
- Thomas Kelly (pro-Treaty) was ill

=== Pro-Treaty ===
Name	Constituency	Vote	Notes
Robert Barton	Kildare–Wicklow	For	One of the principal treaty negotiators
Piaras Béaslaí	Kerry–Limerick West	For	Did not contest 1923 election returning to his career as author and playwright
Ernest Blythe	Monaghan	For	
Patrick Brennan	Clare	For	Resigned Dáil seat on 11 December 1922
Francis Bulfin	Leix–Offaly	For	
Séamus Burke	Tipperary Mid, North and South	For	
Christopher Byrne	Kildare–Wicklow	For	Fianna Fáil TD 1943–44
Thomas Carter	Leitrim–Roscommon North	For	Resigned in 1924 after the Irish Army Mutiny; later a Fianna Fáil TD
Michael Collins	Armagh	For	One of the principal treaty negotiators; killed on 22 August 1922
Michael Collins	Cork Mid, North, South, South–East and West	For	One of the principal treaty negotiators; killed on 22 August 1922
Richard Corish	Wexford	For	Returned to the Labour Party in 1922 and led them for many years
Philip Cosgrave	Dublin North-East	For	
W. T. Cosgrave	Carlow–Kilkenny	For	Later President of the Executive Council of the Irish Free State 1922–32
James Crowley	Kerry–Limerick West	For	
Liam de Róiste	Cork Borough	For	
James Dolan	Leitrim–Roscommon North	For	
Michael Derham	Dublin County	For	
Eamonn Duggan	Louth–Meath	For	One of the principal treaty negotiators
Séamus Dwyer	Dublin County	For	Assassinated by anti-Treaty IRA on 20 December 1922
Desmond FitzGerald	Dublin County	For	
Peter Paul Galligan	Cavan	For	Did not contest the 1922 general election and retired from politics
George Gavan Duffy	Dublin County	For	One of the principal treaty negotiators
Arthur Griffith	Cavan	For	One of the principal treaty negotiators; died on 12 August 1922
Arthur Griffith	Fermanagh and Tyrone	For	One of the principal treaty negotiators; died on 12 August 1922
Seán Hales	Cork Mid, North, South, South–East and West	For	Killed on 6 December 1922
Michael Hayes	National University	For	
Richard Hayes	Limerick City–Limerick East	For	
William Hayes	Limerick City–Limerick East	For	
Seán Hayes	Cork Mid, North, South, South–East and West	For	
Patrick Hogan	Galway	For	
Peter Hughes	Louth–Meath	For	
Andrew Lavin	Leitrim–Roscommon North	For	
Frank Lawless	Dublin County	For	Died on 16 April 1922
Seán Liddy	Clare	For	
Fionán Lynch	Kerry–Limerick West	For	
Joseph Lynch	Leix–Offaly	For	
Joseph MacBride	Mayo North and West	For	
Alexander McCabe	Sligo–Mayo East	For	Resigned seat, 30 October 1924, opposed the Government's reaction to the Army Mutiny.
Patrick McCartan	Leix–Offaly	For	
Daniel McCarthy	Dublin South	For	
Seán Mac Eoin	Longford–Westmeath	For	
Seán McGarry	Dublin Mid	For	Resigned seat, 30 October 1924, opposed the Government's reaction to the Army Mutiny.
Joseph McGinley	Donegal	For	
Patrick McGoldrick	Donegal	For	
Joseph McGrath	Dublin North-East	For	Resigned seat opposed the Government's reaction to the Army Mutiny.
Joseph McGuinness	Longford–Westmeath	For	Died on 31 May 1922
Justin McKenna	Louth–Meath	For	
Seán Milroy	Cavan	For	Resigned seat, 30 October 1924, opposed the Government's reaction to the Army Mutiny.
Seán Milroy	Fermanagh and Tyrone	For	Resigned seat, 30 October 1924, opposed the Government's reaction to the Army Mutiny.
Richard Mulcahy	Dublin North-East	For	
James Murphy	Louth–Meath	For	
George Nicolls	Galway	For	
Thomas O'Donnell	Sligo–Mayo East	For	
Eoin O'Duffy	Monaghan	For	Resigned Dáil seat on 11 December 1922
Kevin O'Higgins	Leix–Offaly	For	Assassinated in 1927 by the pro-civil war IRA for his role in executions
Patrick O'Keeffe	Cork Mid, North, South, South–East and West	For	Deputy governor of Mountjoy Prison during the Civil War
Pádraic Ó Máille	Galway	For	
Daniel O'Rourke	Mayo South–Roscommon South	For	Fianna Fáil TD and Senator in the 1930s, 40s and 50s
Gearóid O'Sullivan	Carlow–Kilkenny	For	
Lorcan Robbins	Longford–Westmeath	For	
William Sears	Mayo South–Roscommon South	For	
Michael Staines	Dublin North-East	For	Later the first Garda Commissioner
Joseph Sweeney	Donegal	For	Later Chief of Staff of the Defence Forces 1929–31
J. J. Walsh	Cork Borough	For	
Peter Ward	Donegal	For	
Joseph Whelehan	Galway	For	Later the Chief Scout of the Catholic Boy Scouts of Ireland
Vincent White	Waterford–Tipperary East	For	

=== Anti-Treaty ===
Name	Constituency	Vote	Notes
Edward Aylward	Carlow–Kilkenny	Against	
Harry Boland	Mayo South–Roscommon South	Against	Died 2 August 1922
Cathal Brugha	Waterford–Tipperary East	Against	Died 7 July 1922
Patrick Cahill	Kerry–Limerick West	Against	
Frank Carty	Sligo–Mayo East	Against	Took his seat in the Dáil on 12 August 1927
Erskine Childers	Kildare–Wicklow	Against	Executed 24 November 1922
Kathleen Clarke	Dublin Mid	Against	Took her seat in the Dáil on 12 August 1927
Michael Colivet	Limerick City–Limerick East	Against	
Con Collins	Kerry–Limerick West	Against	
Daniel Corkery	Cork Mid, North, South, South–East and West	Against	Took his seat in the Dáil on 12 August 1927
John Crowley	Mayo North and West	Against	
Bryan Cusack	Galway	Against	A founder member of Fianna Fáil in 1926; stood unsuccessfully for the party in Galway at the June 1927 general election
Eamon Dee	Waterford–Tipperary East	Against	
Éamon de Valera	Clare	Against	Took his seat in the Dáil on 12 August 1927
Éamon de Valera	Down	Against	Took his seat in the Dáil on 12 August 1927
Thomas Derrig	Mayo North and West	Against	Took his seat in the Dáil on 12 August 1927
James Devins	Sligo–Mayo East	Against	Died 20 September 1922
Séamus Doyle	Wexford	Against	
Ada English	National University	Against	
Seán Etchingham	Wexford	Against	Died 23 April 1923
Frank Fahy	Galway	Against	Took his seat in the Dáil on 12 August 1927
Francis Ferran	Sligo–Mayo East	Against	Died 10 June 1923
Séamus Fitzgerald	Cork East and North–East	Against	Took his seat in Seanad Éireann, 1934
Thomas Hunter	Cork East and North–East	Against	
David Kent	Cork East and North–East	Against	
James Lennon	Carlow–Kilkenny	Against	Also a major figure in the Irish Monetary Reform Association
Seán MacEntee	Monaghan	Against	Took his seat in the Dáil on 12 August 1927
Joseph MacDonagh	Tipperary Mid, North and South	Against	Died 25 December 1922
Mary MacSwiney	Cork Borough	Against	Signed statement on 8 December 1938
Seán MacSwiney	Cork Mid, North, South, South–East and West	Against	
Tom Maguire	Mayo South–Roscommon South	Against	Signed statement on 8 December 1938
Constance Markievicz	Dublin South	Against	In the June 1927 general election, she was re-elected to the 5th Dáil as a candidate for the new Fianna Fáil party, which was pledged to return to Dáil Éireann, but died only five weeks later, before she could take up her seat.
Liam Mellows	Galway	Against	Died 8 December 1922
P. J. Moloney	Tipperary Mid, North and South	Against	
Seán Moylan	Cork Mid, North, South, South–East and West	Against	Took his seat in the Dáil in 1932
Seán Nolan	Cork Mid, North, South, South–East and West	Against	
Patrick O'Byrne	Tipperary Mid, North and South	Against	
Donal O'Callaghan	Cork Borough	Against	
Kathleen O'Callaghan	Limerick City–Limerick East	Against	
Art O'Connor	Kildare–Wicklow	Against	
Joseph O'Doherty	Donegal	Against	Took his seat in the Seanad in 1928
Thomas O'Donoghue	Kerry–Limerick West	Against	Elected as an anti-Treaty Sinn Féin TD to the 3rd Dáil at the 1922 general election, though he did not take his seat. He was re-elected at the 1923 election and again did not take his seat.
Samuel O'Flaherty	Donegal	Against	
Brian O'Higgins	Clare	Against	Signed statement on 8 December 1938
John J. O'Kelly	Louth–Meath	Against	Signed statement on 8 December 1938
Seán T. O'Kelly	Dublin Mid	Against	Took his seat in the Dáil on 12 August 1927
Seán O'Mahony	Fermanagh and Tyrone	Against	Member of the House of Commons of Northern Ireland for Fermanagh and Tyrone for the Nationalist Party (Northern Ireland)
Cathal Ó Murchadha	Dublin South	Against	Signed statement on 8 December 1938
Margaret Pearse	Dublin County	Against	Joined Fianna Fáil, 1926
George Noble Plunkett	Leitrim–Roscommon North	Against	Signed statement on 8 December 1938
Séumas Robinson	Waterford–Tipperary East	Against	Took his seat in the Seanad in 1928
Edmund Roche	Kerry–Limerick West	Against	
P. J. Ruttledge	Mayo North and West	Against	Took his seat in the Dáil on 12 August 1927
James Ryan	Wexford	Against	Took his seat in the Dáil on 12 August 1927
Philip Shanahan	Dublin Mid	Against	
Austin Stack	Kerry–Limerick West	Against	
William Stockley	National University	Against	Signed statement on 8 December 1938
Domhnall Ua Buachalla	Kildare–Wicklow	Against	Took his seat in the Dáil on 12 August 1927

== Aftermath ==
To satisfy the requirements of the British constitution, the treaty also had to be ratified by the House of Commons of Southern Ireland. Thus Irish nationalists ended their boycott of the home rule parliament to attend the southern House of Commons as MPs. This they did alongside the four Unionist MPs who had refused to recognise the Dáil. In this way the treaty was ratified a second time in Dublin, this time unanimously as the anti-Treaty TDs refused to attend.

Under the terms of the Anglo-Irish Treaty a provisional parliament, considered by nationalists to be the 3rd Dáil, was elected in the 1922 general election on 16 June. Collins and de Valera agreed a pact between the pro- and anti-Treaty wings of Sinn Féin and this pact and the elections were endorsed by the Second Dáil. The new assembly was recognised both by nationalists and the British Government and so replaced both the Parliament of Southern Ireland and the Second Dáil with a single body.

On 9 September 1922, Laurence Ginnell was the only anti-Treaty TD to attend the inaugural meeting of the Provisional Parliament or 3rd Dáil. Before signing the roll, Ginnell said:

"I want some explanation before I sign. I have been elected in pursuance of a decree by Dáil Éireann, which decree embodies the decree of 20 May 1922. I have heard nothing read in reference to that decree, nothing but an Act of a foreign Parliament. I have been elected as a member of Dáil Éireann. I have not been elected to attend any such Parliament. Will anyone tell me with authority whether it is...".

He was at that point interrupted but resumed by saying that he would sign the roll and take his seat in the Assembly if the Assembly were Dáil Éireann. He was informed he was not allowed raise any such question until a Ceann Comhairle had been elected. He continued to ask questions regardless to which he got no answer including his question: "Will any member of the Six Counties be allowed to sit in this Dáil?" W. T. Cosgrave moved at this point that he be excluded from the House. Ginnell protested, and he was dragged out by force.

== See also ==
- Easter Rising
- Irish Free State
- Members of the 2nd Dáil
