= Edmund Roche (Sinn Féin politician) =

Irish politician

Teachta Dála
- In office May 1921 – August 1923
- Constituency: Kerry–Limerick West

Personal details
- Party: Sinn Féin

Edmund Roche was an Irish Sinn Féin politician. He was elected unopposed as a Sinn Féin Teachta Dála (TD) to the Second Dáil for the Kerry–Limerick West constituency at the 1921 elections. He opposed the Anglo-Irish Treaty and voted against it. He was re-elected unopposed at the 1922 general election to the 3rd Dáil as an anti-Treaty Sinn Féin TD but did not take his seat. He did not contest the 1923 general election.

Dáil	Election	Deputy (Party)	Deputy (Party)	Deputy (Party)	Deputy (Party)	Deputy (Party)	Deputy (Party)	Deputy (Party)	Deputy (Party)
2nd	1921	Piaras Béaslaí (SF)	James Crowley (SF)	Fionán Lynch (SF)	Patrick Cahill (SF)	Con Collins (SF)	Thomas O'Donoghue (SF)	Edmund Roche (SF)	Austin Stack (SF)
3rd	1922	Piaras Béaslaí (PT-SF)	James Crowley (PT-SF)	Fionán Lynch (PT-SF)	Patrick Cahill (AT-SF)	Con Collins (AT-SF)	Thomas O'Donoghue (AT-SF)	Edmund Roche (AT-SF)	Austin Stack (AT-SF)
4th	1923	Constituency abolished. See Kerry and Limerick							
