= Thomas O'Donnell (Sinn Féin politician) =

Irish politician (1876–1945)

Teachta Dála
- In office May 1921 – August 1923
- Constituency: Sligo–Mayo East

Personal details
- Born: c. 1876
- Died: 1945 (aged 68/69)
- Party: Sinn Féin; Cumann na nGaedheal

Thomas O'Donnell (c. 1876 – 1945) was an Irish politician. He was elected unopposed as a Sinn Féin Teachta Dála (TD) to the Second Dáil at the 1921 elections for the Sligo–Mayo East constituency. He supported the Anglo-Irish Treaty and voted in favour of it. He was re-elected as a pro-Treaty Sinn Féin TD at the 1922 general election. At the 1923 general election, he stood as a Cumann na nGaedheal candidate for the Leitrim–Sligo constituency but he was not elected.

Dáil	Election	Deputy (Party)	Deputy (Party)	Deputy (Party)	Deputy (Party)	Deputy (Party)
2nd	1921	Frank Carty (SF)	James Devins (SF)	Francis Ferran (SF)	Alexander McCabe (SF)	Thomas O'Donnell (SF)
3rd	1922	Frank Carty (AT-SF)	James Devins (AT-SF)	Francis Ferran (AT-SF)	Alexander McCabe (PT-SF)	Thomas O'Donnell (PT-SF)
4th	1923	Constituency abolished. See Mayo North, Mayo South and Leitrim–Sligo				
