= William Hayes (Irish politician) =

Irish politician

Teachta Dála
- In office May 1921 – August 1923
- Constituency: Limerick City–Limerick East

Personal details
- Party: Sinn Féin

William Hayes was an Irish politician and farmer. He was elected unopposed as a Sinn Féin Teachta Dála (TD) to the Second Dáil at the 1921 elections for the Limerick City–Limerick East constituency. He supported the Anglo-Irish Treaty and voted in favour of it. He was re-elected unopposed as a pro-Treaty Sinn Féin TD at the 1922 general election. He did not contest the 1923 general election.

Dáil	Election	Deputy (Party)	Deputy (Party)	Deputy (Party)	Deputy (Party)
2nd	1921	Richard Hayes (SF)	William Hayes (SF)	Kathleen O'Callaghan (SF)	Michael Colivet (SF)
3rd	1922	Richard Hayes (PT-SF)	William Hayes (PT-SF)	Kathleen O'Callaghan (AT-SF)	Michael Colivet (AT-SF)
4th	1923	Constituency abolished. See Limerick			
