= Alexander McCabe =

Irish politician (1886–1972)

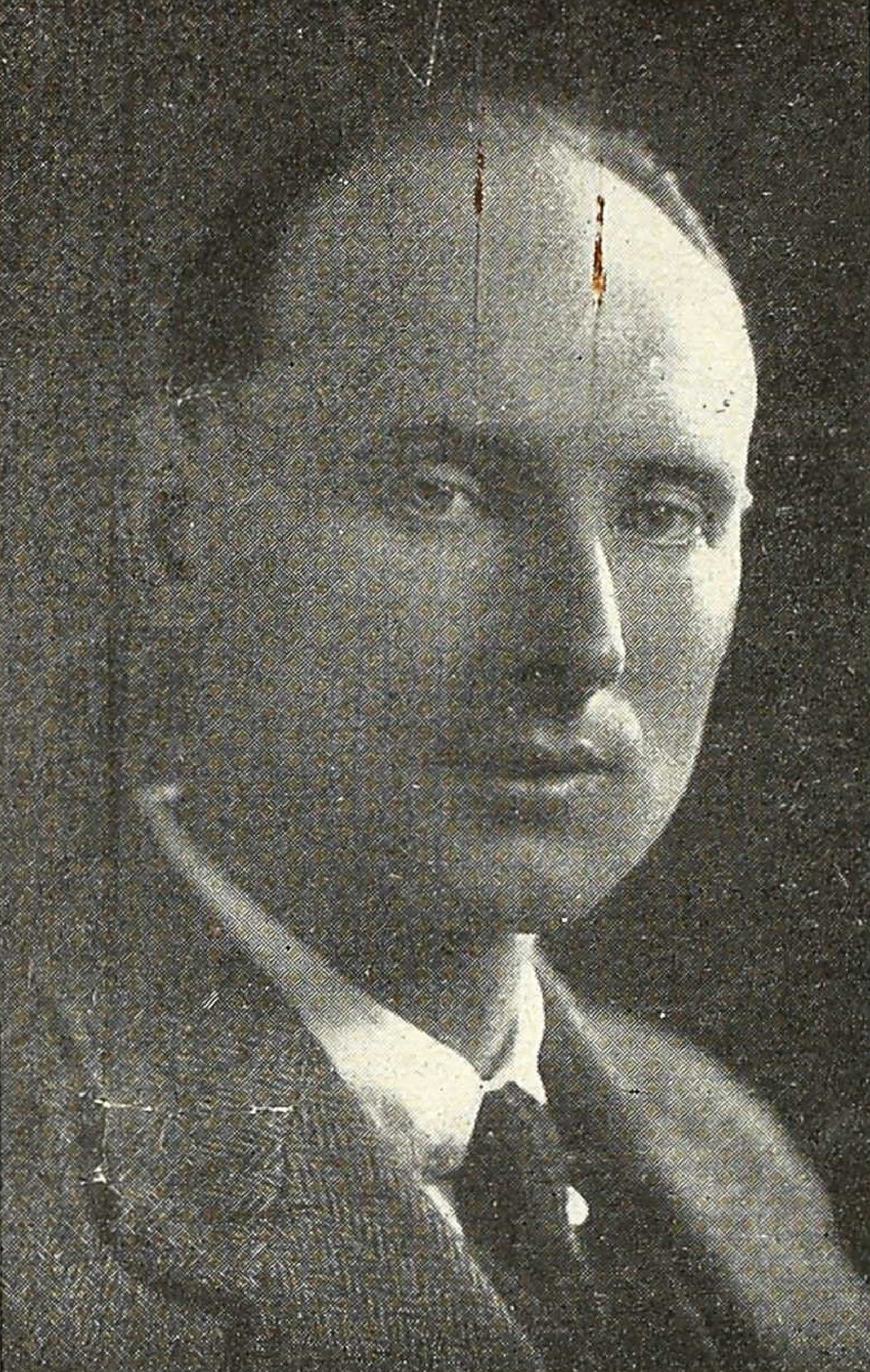
- McCabe, c. 1922

Teachta Dála
- In office August 1923 – 30 October 1924
- Constituency: Leitrim–Sligo
- In office May 1921 – August 1923
- Constituency: Sligo–Mayo East
- In office December 1918 – May 1921
- Constituency: Sligo South

Personal details
- Born: 5 June 1886 Keash, County Sligo, Ireland
- Died: 31 May 1972 (aged 85) Dublin, Ireland
- Party: Sinn Féin; Cumann na nGaedheal; National Group
- Children: 4
- Education: St Patrick's College, Dublin; University College Dublin

Military service
- Branch/service: Irish Volunteers; Irish Republican Brotherhood

Alexander McCabe (Irish: Alasdar Mac Cába; 5 June 1886 – 31 May 1972) was an Irish Sinn Féin (later Cumann na nGaedheal) politician.

== Early life ==
He was born in Keash, County Sligo in 1886. He was educated at Summerhill College, Sligo. He won a scholarship to St Patrick's College of Education, Drumcondra, Dublin, and later obtained a diploma from University College Dublin. He was appointed headmaster of Drumnagranchy national school, County Sligo in 1907. He joined the Irish Republican Brotherhood in 1913.

== Politics ==
He was elected as a Sinn Féin MP for the constituency of South Sligo at the 1918 general election. In January 1919, Sinn Féin MPs refused to recognise the Parliament of the United Kingdom and instead assembled at the Mansion House in Dublin as a revolutionary parliament called Dáil Éireann, though McCabe did not attend as he was in prison in Lincoln Gaol.

At the 1921 Irish elections, he was re-elected for Sligo–Mayo East. He supported the Anglo-Irish Treaty and voted in favour of it. He was again re-elected for Sligo–Mayo East at the 1922 general election, this time as pro-Treaty Sinn Féin Teachta Dála (TD). During the Treaty debate he asserted that the counties of Ulster which comprised "Northern Ireland" could never be incorporated into an Irish Republic while the British Empire was what it was.

At the 1923 general election, he was elected as a Cumann na nGaedheal TD for Leitrim–Sligo. He resigned from Cumann na nGaedheal in 1924 because of dissatisfaction with government attitude to certain army officers and joined the National Group led by Joseph McGrath.

He resigned his Dáil seat on 30 October 1924 along with several other TDs, and the resulting by-election on 11 March 1925 was won by the Cumann na nGaedheal candidate Martin Roddy. He did not stand for public office again and returned to his post as a schoolteacher.

In the 1930s he was involved with the short-lived but widely followed Irish Christian Front, serving as the organisation's secretary and announcing its creation to the public on 22 August 1936. He was also a member of the Blueshirts during this period and later the Irish Friends of Germany (later known as the 'National Club') during World War II, a would-be Nazi collaborator group in the event that Germany invaded Ireland. McCabe chaired their meetings, denied the group was a fifth column and expressed the belief that a German victory would lead to a United Ireland. He was interned in 1940–1941 due to his pro-German sympathies, which he claimed resulted from the desire to ‘see the very life-blood squeezed out of England’.

== After politics ==
In 1935 he co-founded the Educational Building Society (EBS) with Thomas J. O'Connell. He retired from teaching in the 1940s and became the full-time managing director of the EBS.

== Sources ==
- Todd Andrews (1979), Dublin Made Me.
- Robert Fisk (1983), In Time of War.

== Gallery ==
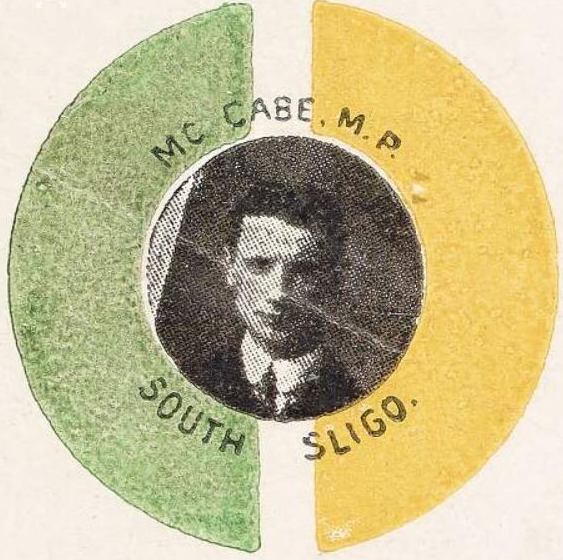
McCabe in 1918

British Army military intelligence file for Alexander McCabe

Parliament of the United Kingdom
Preceded by John O'Dowd	Member of Parliament for Sligo South; 1918–1922	Constituency abolished
Oireachtas
New constituency	Teachta Dála for Sligo South; 1918–1921	Constituency abolished

Dáil	Election	Deputy (Party)	Deputy (Party)	Deputy (Party)	Deputy (Party)	Deputy (Party)
2nd	1921	Frank Carty (SF)	James Devins (SF)	Francis Ferran (SF)	Alexander McCabe (SF)	Thomas O'Donnell (SF)
3rd	1922	Frank Carty (AT-SF)	James Devins (AT-SF)	Francis Ferran (AT-SF)	Alexander McCabe (PT-SF)	Thomas O'Donnell (PT-SF)
4th	1923	Constituency abolished. See Mayo North, Mayo South and Leitrim–Sligo				

Dáil	Election	Deputy (Party)	Deputy (Party)	Deputy (Party)	Deputy (Party)	Deputy (Party)	Deputy (Party)	Deputy (Party)
4th	1923	Martin McGowan (Rep)	Frank Carty (Rep)	Thomas Carter (CnaG)	Seán Farrell (Rep)	James Dolan (CnaG)	John Hennigan (CnaG)	Alexander McCabe (CnaG)
4th	1925 by-election	Martin McGowan (Rep)	Frank Carty (Rep)	Samuel Holt (Rep)	Seán Farrell (Rep)	James Dolan (CnaG)	John Hennigan (CnaG)	Martin Roddy (CnaG)
5th	1927 (Jun)	John Jinks (NL)	Frank Carty (FF)	Samuel Holt (FF)	Michael Carter (FP)	James Dolan (CnaG)	John Hennigan (CnaG)	Martin Roddy (CnaG)
6th	1927 (Sep)	Bernard Maguire (FF)	Frank Carty (FF)	Samuel Holt (FF)	Patrick Reynolds (CnaG)	James Dolan (CnaG)	John Hennigan (CnaG)	Martin Roddy (CnaG)
6th	1929 by-election	Bernard Maguire (FF)	Frank Carty (FF)	Seán Mac Eoin (CnaG)	Patrick Reynolds (CnaG)	James Dolan (CnaG)	John Hennigan (CnaG)	Martin Roddy (CnaG)
7th	1932	Bernard Maguire (FF)	Frank Carty (FF)	Stephen Flynn (FF)	Mary Reynolds (CnaG)	William Browne (FF)	John Hennigan (CnaG)	Martin Roddy (CnaG)
8th	1933	Bernard Maguire (FF)	Frank Carty (FF)	Stephen Flynn (FF)	Patrick Rogers (NCP)	William Browne (FF)	James Dolan (CnaG)	Martin Roddy (CnaG)
9th	1937	Constituency abolished. See Sligo and Leitrim						
