= James Devins (Sinn Féin politician) =

Irish politician (1873–1922)

Teachta Dála
- In office May 1921 – 20 September 1922
- Constituency: Sligo–Mayo East

Personal details
- Born: 1873 County Sligo, Ireland
- Died: 20 September 1922 (aged 48) County Sligo, Ireland
- Party: Sinn Féin
- Relatives: Jimmy Devins (grandson)

James Devins (1873 – 20 September 1922) was an Irish Sinn Féin politician. He was elected unopposed as a Sinn Féin Teachta Dála (TD) to the Second Dáil at the 1921 elections for the Sligo–Mayo East constituency. He opposed the Anglo-Irish Treaty and voted against it. He was re-elected as an anti-Treaty Sinn Féin TD to the 3rd Dáil at the 1922 general election. During the Irish Civil War, Devins fought for the anti-Treaty IRA "Irregulars". After a skirmish on Benbulbin with the pro-Treaty National Army, Devins and five other were summarily executed despite having surrendered. They are commemorated by sympathisers as "Sligo's Noble Six".

James Devins' grandson Jimmy Devins served as a Fianna Fáil TD for Sligo–North Leitrim from 2002 to 2011.

== See also ==
- Families in the Oireachtas

Dáil	Election	Deputy (Party)	Deputy (Party)	Deputy (Party)	Deputy (Party)	Deputy (Party)
2nd	1921	Frank Carty (SF)	James Devins (SF)	Francis Ferran (SF)	Alexander McCabe (SF)	Thomas O'Donnell (SF)
3rd	1922	Frank Carty (AT-SF)	James Devins (AT-SF)	Francis Ferran (AT-SF)	Alexander McCabe (PT-SF)	Thomas O'Donnell (PT-SF)
4th	1923	Constituency abolished. See Mayo North, Mayo South and Leitrim–Sligo				
