= Francis Ferran =

Irish politician (died 1923)

Teachta Dála
- In office May 1921 – 10 June 1923
- Constituency: Sligo–Mayo East

Personal details
- Died: 10 June 1923 Curragh Camp, County Kildare, Ireland
- Party: Sinn Féin
- Education: Queen's University Belfast

Francis Patrick Ferran (died 10 June 1923) was an Irish Sinn Féin politician and medical practitioner. He was elected unopposed as a Sinn Féin Teachta Dála (TD) to the Second Dáil at the 1921 elections for the Sligo–Mayo East constituency. He opposed the Anglo-Irish Treaty and voted against it. He was elected as an anti-Treaty Sinn Féin TD at the 1922 general election but did not take his seat. He died while imprisoned by the pro-Treaty government during the Irish Civil War at the Curragh Camp in 1923.

Dáil	Election	Deputy (Party)	Deputy (Party)	Deputy (Party)	Deputy (Party)	Deputy (Party)
2nd	1921	Frank Carty (SF)	James Devins (SF)	Francis Ferran (SF)	Alexander McCabe (SF)	Thomas O'Donnell (SF)
3rd	1922	Frank Carty (AT-SF)	James Devins (AT-SF)	Francis Ferran (AT-SF)	Alexander McCabe (PT-SF)	Thomas O'Donnell (PT-SF)
4th	1923	Constituency abolished. See Mayo North, Mayo South and Leitrim–Sligo				
