= Frank Carty =

Irish politician (1897–1942)

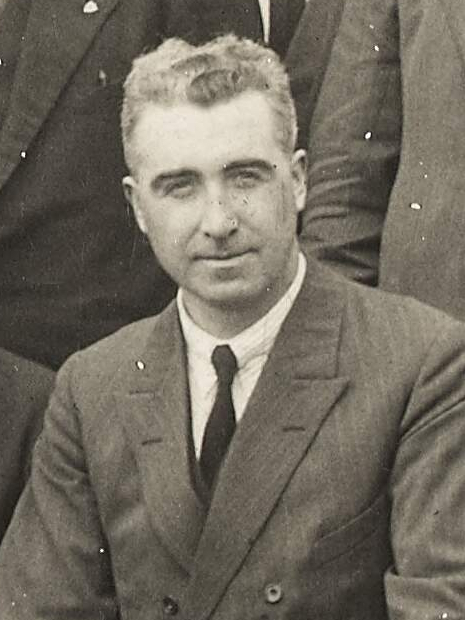
- Carty in 1927

Teachta Dála
- In office July 1937 – 10 September 1942
- Constituency: Sligo
- In office August 1923 – July 1937
- Constituency: Leitrim–Sligo
- In office May 1921 – August 1923
- Constituency: Sligo–Mayo East

Personal details
- Born: Francis Joseph Carty; 3 April 1897
- Died: 10 September 1942 (aged 45)
- Party: Sinn Féin; Fianna Fáil
- Spouse: Kathleen McGowan (m. 1938)

Francis Joseph Carty (3 April 1897 – 10 September 1942) was a leader of the Irish Republican Army (IRA) in the Irish War of Independence, and a long-serving Fianna Fáil Teachta Dála (TD). Carty was the Commandant of the IRA's South Sligo Brigade and its Flying column.

== Early life ==
He was born on 3 April 1897 in Clooncunny, County Sligo, the only son of John Carty and Ellen Carty (née Rice).

== Revolutionary period and prison ==
Frank Carty claimed membership of the Irish Volunteers from 1914 and of the Irish Republican Brotherhood from 1915. Carty was arrested in February 1920 and his first escape from confinement came on 26 June 1920, when he was rescued from Sligo Gaol.

On 15 February 1921, Carty next escaped from Derry Gaol. The rescue party was led by Charles McGuinness. Carty was taken from the city in a coal boat, the Carricklee by the first mate Oskar Norrby, a Swede.

Following recapture, Frank Carty was later involved in an incident in Glasgow, Scotland when on 4 May 1921, members of the Irish Republican Army (IRA) attempted to free him from a prison van in a failed escape attempt. One Inspector was killed by gunfire, and another was wounded. Following the incident, thirteen people were brought to trial, but were acquitted by the jury, which accepted their alibi.

Carty became a member of the anti-Treaty IRA Army Executive in spring 1922. Taking the anti-Treaty side in the Irish Civil War, Carty took part in several attacks and operations against National forces. He claims that in March 1923, he was appointed Officer Commanding of the Active Service Units of the newly constituted IRA Western Command. Carty evaded arrest/capture and remained 'on the run' until the end of 1924. Carty was later awarded a pension for his service with the Irish Volunteers and the IRA between 1917 and 1923.

== Political career ==
Carty was first elected in the 1921 general election to the Second Dáil for the Sligo–Mayo East constituency, and was re-elected in eight successive general elections. In common with other TDs opposed to the Anglo-Irish Treaty, he did not take his seat in the 3rd Dáil or in the 4th Dáil, returning to Leinster House only as a founder member of Fianna Fáil, when he followed Éamon de Valera into the 5th Dáil, taking his seat on 12 August 1927.

He remained active in local politics, being a member of the Sligo County Council from 1928 to 1934 representing the Tubbercurry area. He was re-elected in August 1942, only a month before his death, after which his Dáil seat remained vacant until the 1943 general election.

Self-educated, he was called to the bar in 1936. He married Kathleen McGowan in 1938; they had no children.

== Sources ==
- Younger, Carlton (1968). "Ireland's Civil War", 354.
- Coyle, Stephen (2008). "High Noon on High Street: The Story of a Daring Ambush by the IRA in Glasgow in 1921". ISBN 978-1-873586-44-0.
- James, Lawrence. "Warrior Race: A History of the British at War", Macmillan (2003), 354, ISBN 0-312-30737-3, ISBN 978-0-312-30737-0.

Dáil	Election	Deputy (Party)	Deputy (Party)	Deputy (Party)	Deputy (Party)	Deputy (Party)
2nd	1921	Frank Carty (SF)	James Devins (SF)	Francis Ferran (SF)	Alexander McCabe (SF)	Thomas O'Donnell (SF)
3rd	1922	Frank Carty (AT-SF)	James Devins (AT-SF)	Francis Ferran (AT-SF)	Alexander McCabe (PT-SF)	Thomas O'Donnell (PT-SF)
4th	1923	Constituency abolished. See Mayo North, Mayo South and Leitrim–Sligo				

Dáil	Election	Deputy (Party)	Deputy (Party)	Deputy (Party)	Deputy (Party)	Deputy (Party)	Deputy (Party)	Deputy (Party)
4th	1923	Martin McGowan (Rep)	Frank Carty (Rep)	Thomas Carter (CnaG)	Seán Farrell (Rep)	James Dolan (CnaG)	John Hennigan (CnaG)	Alexander McCabe (CnaG)
4th	1925 by-election	Martin McGowan (Rep)	Frank Carty (Rep)	Samuel Holt (Rep)	Seán Farrell (Rep)	James Dolan (CnaG)	John Hennigan (CnaG)	Martin Roddy (CnaG)
5th	1927 (Jun)	John Jinks (NL)	Frank Carty (FF)	Samuel Holt (FF)	Michael Carter (FP)	James Dolan (CnaG)	John Hennigan (CnaG)	Martin Roddy (CnaG)
6th	1927 (Sep)	Bernard Maguire (FF)	Frank Carty (FF)	Samuel Holt (FF)	Patrick Reynolds (CnaG)	James Dolan (CnaG)	John Hennigan (CnaG)	Martin Roddy (CnaG)
6th	1929 by-election	Bernard Maguire (FF)	Frank Carty (FF)	Seán Mac Eoin (CnaG)	Patrick Reynolds (CnaG)	James Dolan (CnaG)	John Hennigan (CnaG)	Martin Roddy (CnaG)
7th	1932	Bernard Maguire (FF)	Frank Carty (FF)	Stephen Flynn (FF)	Mary Reynolds (CnaG)	William Browne (FF)	John Hennigan (CnaG)	Martin Roddy (CnaG)
8th	1933	Bernard Maguire (FF)	Frank Carty (FF)	Stephen Flynn (FF)	Patrick Rogers (NCP)	William Browne (FF)	James Dolan (CnaG)	Martin Roddy (CnaG)
9th	1937	Constituency abolished. See Sligo and Leitrim						

Dáil	Election	Deputy (Party)	Deputy (Party)	Deputy (Party)
9th	1937	Frank Carty (FF)	Martin Roddy (FG)	Patrick Rogers (FG)
10th	1938	Frank Carty (FF)	Martin Brennan (FF)	Patrick Rogers (FG)
11th	1943	Martin Roddy (FG)	Martin Brennan (FF)	Patrick Rogers (FG)
12th	1944	Martin Roddy (FG)	Martin Brennan (FF)	Patrick Rogers (FG)
13th	1948	Constituency abolished. See Sligo–Leitrim		
