= Sligo–Mayo East =

Dáil constituency (1921–1923)

- Former Dáil constituency
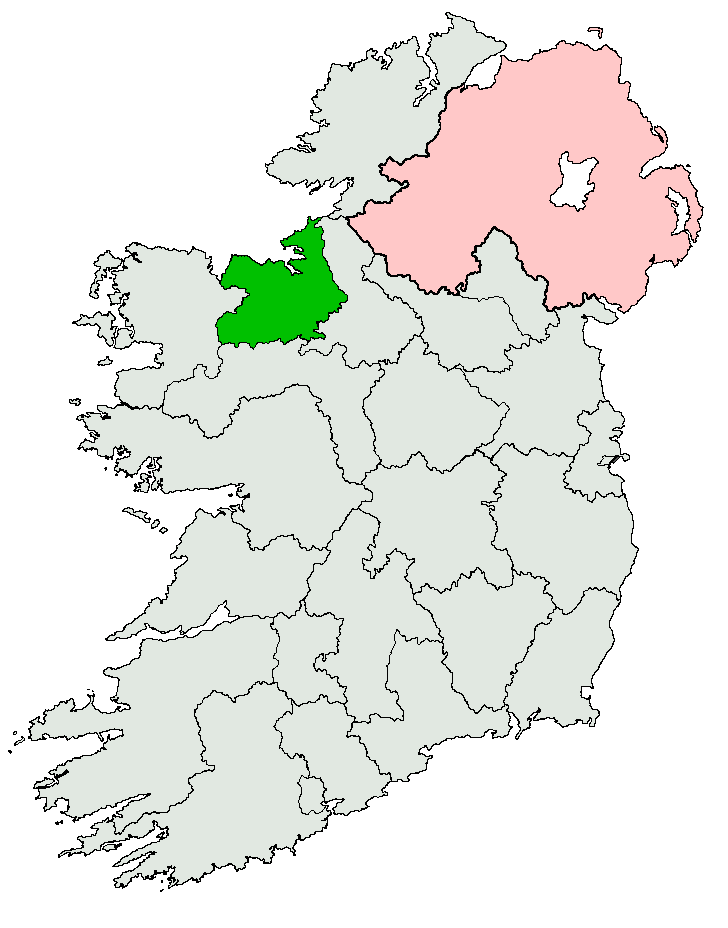
- Location of Sligo–Mayo East within Ireland

Former constituency
- Created: 1921
- Abolished: 1923
- Seats: 5
- Local government areas: County Sligo; County Mayo
- Created from: East Mayo; North Sligo; South Sligo
- Replaced by: Mayo North; Mayo South; Leitrim–Sligo

Sligo–Mayo East was a parliamentary constituency represented in Dáil Éireann, the lower house of the Irish parliament or Oireachtas from 1921 to 1923. The constituency elected 5 deputies (Teachtaí Dála, commonly known as TDs) to the Dáil, on the system of proportional representation by means of the single transferable vote (PR-STV).

== History and boundaries ==
The constituency was created in 1921 as a 5-seat constituency, under the Government of Ireland Act 1920, for the 1921 general election to the House of Commons of Southern Ireland, whose members formed the Second Dáil.

It succeeded the constituencies of Mayo East, Sligo North and Sligo South which were used to elect the Members of the 1st Dáil and earlier United Kingdom House of Commons members. It covered all of County Sligo and the eastern parts of County Mayo.

It was abolished under the Electoral Act 1923, when it was replaced by the new Mayo South and Leitrim–Sligo constituencies which was first used in the 1923 general election to the 4th Dáil.

== TDs ==
Teachtaí Dála (TDs) for Sligo–Mayo East 1921–1923
Key to parties: SF = Sinn Féin; AT-SF = Sinn Féin (Anti-Treaty); PT-SF = Sinn Féin (Pro-Treaty)
Dáil	Election	Deputy (Party)	Deputy (Party)	Deputy (Party)	Deputy (Party)	Deputy (Party)
2nd	1921	Frank Carty (SF)	James Devins (SF)	Francis Ferran (SF)	Alexander McCabe (SF)	Thomas O'Donnell (SF)
3rd	1922	Frank Carty (AT-SF)	James Devins (AT-SF)	Francis Ferran (AT-SF)	Alexander McCabe (PT-SF)	Thomas O'Donnell (PT-SF)
4th	1923	Constituency abolished. See Mayo North, Mayo South and Leitrim–Sligo				

Note: The columns in this table are used only for presentational purposes, and no significance should be attached to the order of columns. For details of the order in which seats were won at each election, see the detailed results of that election.

== Elections ==
*: Outgoing TD

=== 1922 general election ===
1922 general election: Sligo–Mayo East
Party	Candidate	FPv%	Count					
Party	Candidate	FPv%	1	2	3	4	5	6
Sinn Féin (Pro-Treaty)	Alexander McCabe	22.5	7,759					
Sinn Féin (Anti-Treaty)	James Devins	21.4	7,370					
Sinn Féin (Anti-Treaty)	Francis Ferran	19.6	6,752					
Sinn Féin (Anti-Treaty)	Frank Carty	15.5	5,335	5,611	7,102			
Independent	John Hennigan	11.1	3,841	4,198	4,253	4,322	4,365	5,046
Sinn Féin (Pro-Treaty)	Thomas O'Donnell	7.1	2,434	3,574	3,629	4,534	5,641	6,122
Independent	Seamus McGowan	2.9	1,008	1,244	1,263	1,291	1,317	
Electorate: 62,509 Valid: 34,499 Quota: 5,750 Turnout: 55.2%

=== 1921 general election ===
1921 general election: Sligo–Mayo East (uncontested)
Party	Candidate
Sinn Féin	Frank Carty
Sinn Féin	James Devins
Sinn Féin	Francis Ferran
Sinn Féin	Alexander McCabe
Sinn Féin	Thomas O'Donnell

== See also ==
- Dáil constituencies
- Politics of the Republic of Ireland
- Historic Dáil constituencies
- Elections in the Republic of Ireland
