= 1921 Northern Ireland and Southern Ireland general elections =

- 24 May 1921
- House of Commons of Southern Ireland
- All 128 seats in the House of Commons; 65 seats needed for a majority
Party	Leader	Seats
Sinn Féin	Éamon de Valera	124
Ind. Unionist	None	4
This lists parties that won seats. See the complete results below.
- House of Commons of Northern Ireland
- All 52 seats in the House of Commons; 27 seats needed for a majority
Party	Leader	Vote %	Seats
UUP	James Craig	66.9	40
Sinn Féin	Éamon de Valera	20.5	6
Nationalist	Joseph Devlin	11.8	6
This lists parties that won seats. See the complete results below.
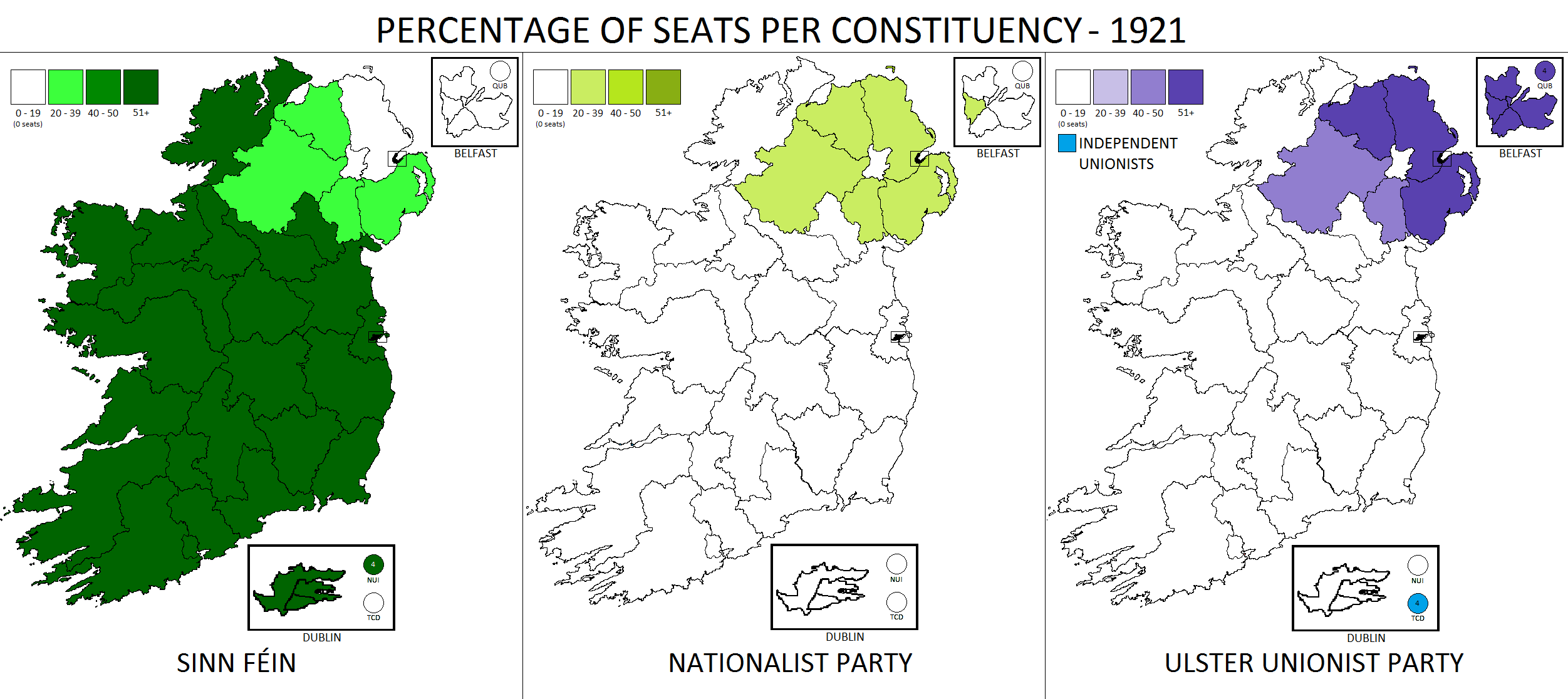
Results of the 1921 Irish elections

General elections took place in Ireland in May 1921 to elect members of the House of Commons of Northern Ireland and the House of Commons of Southern Ireland. These legislatures had been established by the Government of Ireland Act 1920, which granted Home Rule to a partitioned Ireland within the United Kingdom. Polling day was 24 May (Note: Voting continued until 28 May for Queen's University, Belfast.) and nomination day was 13 May. (Note: Nomination day was 14 May for the National University of Ireland.) Since no seats were contested in Southern Ireland, all candidates were returned unopposed on 13 May: 124 for Sinn Féin and 4 Independent Unionists. Polling only took place in Northern Ireland, where the Ulster Unionist Party (UUP) won a landslide majority. Only the Northern Ireland Commons actually sat as a functional body; the Sinn Féin candidates elected to either Commons as abstentionists boycotted them both and instead assembled as the Second Dáil.

== Background ==
On 21 January 1919, the Sinn Féin MPs elected to the British House of Commons at the 1918 general election met as Dáil Éireann and declared independence from the United Kingdom as the Irish Republic. This declaration was followed by the Irish War of Independence between the Irish Republican Army (IRA) and Crown forces, which continued until a truce in July 1921.

In November 1920, the British Parliament passed the Government of Ireland Act 1920. This partitioned Ireland into two distinct polities, each with their own Home Rule Parliament: Northern Ireland and Southern Ireland. Both parliaments would be composed of a directly elected House of Commons and an indirectly elected Senate, with both lower chambers being elected by the single transferable vote system of proportional representation.

John Dillon and T. P. O'Connor of the Irish Parliamentary Party (IPP) both agreed that their party should not fight Sinn Féin for seats for the Southern parliament as things stood. Former IPP MP Stephen Gwynn, now a member of the Irish Dominion League, advocated putting up League candidates against Sinn Féin. In early March he met with southern Unionists Viscount Midleton and Lord Oranmore, requesting them to pool their resources to contest the election and contest the election on a platform opposing the IRA's violence, under Midleton's leadership. Midleton declined the invitation, just as he had declined a previous request for his Unionist Anti-Partition League to join the Dominion League.

On 24 March 1921 an Order in Council was made appointing 3 May as the day on which most provisions of the Government of Ireland Act 1920 would come into force. The election proclamation was made on 4 May at Dublin Castle by the Lord Lieutenant of Ireland under the Great Seal of Ireland, whereupon the Clerk of the Crown and Hanaper issued election writs to the returning officer in each constituency. Under the Representation of the People Act 1918, nomination papers were to be presented to the returning officer in person at a specified location within the constituency on the 8th following day (the morning of 13 May) and the poll taken on the 9th following day (24 May). Different dates were set for the first meetings of the Parliament of Northern Ireland and Parliament of Southern Ireland—7 June and 28 June respectively.

On 1 April, Éamon de Valera, as leader of Sinn Féin and President of the Irish Republic, released an "address to the Electorate" announcing that Sinn Féin would not boycott the Southern election but instead contest every constituency "in order that you may have an opportunity of proving once more your loyalty to the principle of Irish Independence". The same day, the Irish part of the 1921 United Kingdom census due on 19 June was "postponed indefinitely" because of the disturbed state of the country and the fact that the Dáil had in March decreed a policy of non-cooperation. Media commented on the incongruity of attempting to hold elections in circumstances where holding a census had proved impossible.

When the date of the elections was announced in the Westminster Commons, the Conservative MP Sir William Davison, who had been born in Broughshane, County Antrim, had asked "What is the object of holding elections in Southern Ireland when any candidates who do not support Sinn Fein would be shot?" Other members replied "How do you know?"

On 10 May 1921, Dáil Éireann passed a resolution that the elections would be used as the Dáil's own general election; once the newly elected members reassembled, the outgoing First Dáil would stand dissolved and superseded by the incoming Second Dáil. The resolution was made in a secret session and not publicised until after the election. The leadership of the Irish Labour Party, which had previously agreed not to stand candidates against Sinn Féin, said at its August conference:

It appears to us somewhat anomalous that such an announcement was deferred until after the elections. It is conceivable that had the electors been informed by a proclamation that the election was to be something more than a demonstration of political allegiance, that the persons elected were to function as the new Legislative authority, a different choice may, in some cases, have been made.

== Results ==
=== Southern Ireland ===
In the area designated as Southern Ireland, no actual polling took place as all 128 candidates were returned unopposed. Of these, 124 were won by Sinn Féin and four by independent Unionists representing Dublin University (Trinity College).

A single Unionist candidate had been selected to contest the constituency of Donegal: Major Robert L Moore, who had contested East Donegal in 1918. Moore however later withdrew his candidacy just before the election.

1921 Southern Ireland general election
Party	Leader	No. of seats	% of seats
Sinn Féin	Éamon de Valera	124	96.9
Independent Unionist		4	3.1
Totals		128	100

Parliamentary seats
Sinn Féin	96.88%
Independent Unionist	3.13%

=== Northern Ireland ===
The general election to the Northern Ireland House of Commons occurred on Tuesday, 24 May. Of 52 seats, including Queen's University of Belfast, 40 were won by Unionists, 6 by the Nationalist Party and 6 by Sinn Féin. Several well known republicans were elected: Éamon de Valera for South Down, Michael Collins for Armagh, Eoin MacNeill for Derry and Arthur Griffith for Fermanagh and Tyrone. Voters in Fermanagh and Tyrone returned an anti-partition majority of 7,831. Allegations were made claiming intimidation of Nationalist voters, arrests of candidates/organisers and the seizure of electoral literature.

1921 Northern Ireland general election
Party	Leader	Seats	% of seats	Votes	% of votes
Ulster Unionist Party	James Craig	40	76.9	343,347	66.9
Sinn Féin	Éamon de Valera	6	11.5	104,917	20.5
Nationalist Party (NI)	Joe Devlin	6	11.5	60,577	11.8
Belfast Labour Party		0	0	3,075	0.6
Independent		0	0	926	0.2
Totals		52	100	512,842	100

First preference vote
Ulster Unionist	66.95%
Sinn Féin	20.46%
Nationalist	11.81%
Belfast Labour	0.60%
Independent	0.18%

Parliamentary seats
Ulster Unionist	76.92%
Sinn Féin	11.54%
Nationalist	11.54%

== Second Dáil ==
Although the elections were formally for two separate legislatures, Irish republicans considered all those elected to be members of the Second Dáil. The composition of the Dáil following these elections was therefore as follows:

Composition of the Second Dáil
Party	Leader	Seats won	% of seats
Sinn Féin	Éamon de Valera	130	72.2
Ulster Unionist Party	James Craig	40	22.2
Nationalist	Joe Devlin	6	3.3
Independent Unionist		4	2.2
Totals		180	100

Parliamentary seats
Sinn Féin	72.2%
Ulster Unionist	22.2%
Nationalist	3.3%
Independent Unionist	2.2%

In practice, however, the Dáil was composed of 125 Sinn Féin members. (Note: Sinn Fein won 130 seats across the two legislatures, but 5 of the 6 candidates elected in Northern Ireland were also elected to the Southern Ireland House of Commons. This meant that when the Second Dáil met, it had 125 members.) The Unionist and Nationalist Party members ignored the invitation to attend the Dáil, while the four independent unionists assembled as the Southern Ireland Commons for a single brief meeting.

== Aftermath ==
The Northern Ireland Commons continued to function, as part of the Parliament of Northern Ireland, until that Home Rule legislature was prorogued in 1972 and abolished in 1973. The Southern Ireland Commons was largely ignored, and its members only had two brief meetings: a formal session of the House summoned by the Lord Lieutenant in June 1921 that only the four unionists attended, and a brief "meeting of members of Parliament elected for constituencies in Southern Ireland" specified by the Anglo-Irish Treaty, held in January 1922 to approve the treaty and establish the Provisional Government, and attended by the four unionists and most of the TDs who had voted for the treaty in the 2nd Dáil the previous week.

== See also ==
- Members of the 2nd Dáil
- Government of the 2nd Dáil
- 1918 United Kingdom general election in Ireland

== Sources ==
- Jackson, Alvin (2004). Home Rule – An Irish History. Oxford University Press.
- O'Day, Alan (1998). Irish Home Rule, 1867–1921. Manchester University Press.
