= Judge Lynch (disambiguation) =

Charles Lynch (judge) (1736–1796) was an American revolutionary who held an irregular court in Virginia to punish Loyalist supporters of the British. Judge Lynch may also refer to:

- Charles Francis Lynch (1884–1942), judge of the U.S. District Court for the District of New Jersey
- Eugene F. Lynch (1931–2019) judge of the U.S. District Court for the Northern District of California
- Fionán Lynch (1889–1966), judge of the Circuit Court of Ireland
- Frank J. Lynch (1922–1987), judge of the Delaware Court of Common Pleas
- Gerard E. Lynch (born 1951), judge of the U.S. Court of Appeals for the Second Circuit
- Sir Henry Lynch, 3rd Baronet (died 1691), judge of the High Court of Ireland
- Kevin Lynch (judge) (1927–2013), judge of the Supreme Court of Ireland
- Matt Lynch (born 1951), judge of the Ohio Court of Appeals
- Sandra Lynch (born 1946), judge of the U.S. Court of Appeals for the First Circuit
- William Joseph Lynch (1908–1976), judge of the U.S. District Court for the Northern District of Illinois

== See also ==
- Justice Lynch (disambiguation)
