= Bula Ltd v Tara Mines Ltd (No 6) =

Irish Supreme Court case

Bula Ltd. v Tara Mines Ltd. (No. 6)
- Coat of arms of Ireland
- Court: Supreme Court of Ireland
- Full case name: Bula Ltd. v. Tara Mines Ltd. (No. 6)
- Decided: 3 July 2000
- Citation: [2000] 4 IR 412

Case history
- Appealed from: The High Court
- Appealed to: The Supreme Court

Court membership
- Judges sitting: Denham J., Mc Guinness J. and Morris J.

Case opinions
- The Supreme Court considered the test for objective bias noting that "If a judge considers that there may be a reasonable apprehension of bias, in accordance with convention, he or she would not sit. However, a judge has a duty to sit and determine cases."
- Decision by: Denham, Mc Guinness JJ., and Morris P.

Keywords
- Fair procedures, Constitutional Justice, Bias, Reasonable apprehension, Failure to raise an alleged procedural unfairness at first opportunity.

Bula Ltd v Tara Mines Ltd (No 6) [2000] IESC 15; [2000] 4 IR 412 is a reported Irish Supreme Court case in which the court considered the test for objective bias in Ireland. During this case the Supreme Court considered:

1. whether Supreme Court has jurisdiction to set aside its own previous order;
2. whether an appellant must show real likelihood of bias or whether reasonable apprehension of bias suffices; and
3. whether a prior relationship of legal advisor and client would disqualify a judge.

== Background ==
Bula Ltd and others (the appellants in the appeal) appealed to the Supreme Court against the judgement and order of the High Court which found in favour of the Respondents.

According to Lynch J. in the High Court

"This case arises out of circumstances which commenced more than a quarter of a century ago. It has its origin in business dealings undertaken in the hopes of arriving at a very large crock of gold, which in the end of the day turned into a bottomless pit of debt and misery for those who most avidly sought the crock of gold. It is from that bottomless pit that the remaining plaintiffs [the appellants in the appeal] in this action hope by this litigation to escape"

The case before the High Court involved an allegation by Bula Limited (in receivership) and others (the plaintiffs in the original hearing) that the first fourteen defendants (the respondents in the appeal) failed to cooperate with them in extracting the zinc and lead core body from their neighbouring mine, contrary to a provision in the lease from the Minister for Energy. The plaintiffs claimed that by failing to cooperate with them, the defendants wrongfully conspired together to "inflict economic loss and damage" to them to such an extent as to ruin their business. In the High Court, the plaintiffs argued that this conspiracy was orchestrated in order to enable the first defendant (Tara Mines Ltd.) to acquire 1/6 of the plaintiff's share of the Navan Zinc and Lead Ore Body at an undervalue. They did so with a view of operating the Navan Zinc and Lead Ore body for their own benefit along with having certain shares invested in it.

With respect to the fifteenth and sixteenth defendants, the plaintiffs argued that by virtue of agreements made with the plaintiffs and other agreements made with Tara Mines Ltd, they were under an obligation to the plaintiffs to prevent the first fourteen defendants from acting in the manner aforesaid. The fifteenth and sixteenth defendants "not only failed to prevent the first fourteen defendants from so acting but on the contrary encouraged and assisted them is so acting." The defendants denied by all allegations and alleged that "the failure of the plaintiffs’ enterprise was due to the plaintiffs’ own incompetence and unreasonable conduct leading to commercial errors of an irrational and disastrous nature."

Lynch J. dismissed all claims against the defendants.

Bula Ltd. appealed to the Supreme Court. The Supreme Court (Hamilton CJ, Barrington and Keane JJ) upheld the High Court decision.

Bula Ltd (in receivership), Bula Holdings, Richard Wood and Michael Wymes then sought to have the judgment and order of the Supreme Court set aside on the grounds of objective bias.

== Holding of the Supreme Court ==
Written judgments were provided by Denham J and McGuinness J, with Morris P concurring.

In addition to seeking to have the judgment and order of the Supreme Court set aside, the appellants also sought discovery of certain documents which they claim were necessary so as to present their case before the court. In relation to the latter, the court refused the appellants discovery of any documents.

In relation to the application by way of notice of motion seeking to set aside the Supreme Court order, the appellants alleged that the previous Supreme Court judges (Barrington J and Keane J) who decided their appeal was connected to the defendants, something that "gave rise to a perception of bias."

Counsel on behalf of the appellants submitted that the circumstances of this case was such that it is permissible for the Supreme Court to review its own judgement. They claimed that the facts show there was a clear breach of the appellant's constitutional rights to fair procedures and constitutional due process. Counsel for the appellants submitted evidence of sixteen previous occasions where Barrington J and Keane J acted for or advised a number of the respondents in relation to issues pertinent to and connected with the issues at hand in this case. These facts, they argued, constituted objective bias (or at least the reasonable apprehension of bias).

The first issue before the court was, therefore, whether it could review its own decision of a previous case.

The Court held that it does have the jurisdiction to review its own decision. Such jurisdiction only arises in "exceptional and rare cases" - there should be a reasonable issue at hand and there should be clear breaches of natural justice for a court to decide whether or not it should review a previously decided judgement.

With respect to bias, the appellants alleged objective rather than actual bias. The appellants therefore argued that the two judges who heard the appeal were "disqualified on grounds of objective bias and ought to have disqualified themselves of objective bias". Denham J concluded that in order for a judge to be disqualified from hearing a case, there"must be a factor giving rise to a "reasonable apprehension of bias in the mind of a reasonable person." Denham J went on to note that "[i]f a judge considers that there may be a reasonable apprehension of bias, in accordance with convention, he or she would not sit. However, a judge has a duty to sit and determine cases." In this case, however, objective bias had not been established. As the judge noted, "The applicants have argued that there were seventeen links. Many were repetitive and misunderstood the relationship of counsel to client. Seventeen links were alleged. None of the seventeen raises a ground. Seventeen noughts are still nothing." McGuinness J similarly concluded that the professional links established did not give rise to a reasonable apprehension of bias.

The Supreme Court accordingly unanimously dismissed the motion.

== See also ==
- Supreme Court of Ireland
- High Court (Ireland)
