= Justice Lynch =

Justice Lynch may refer to:

- Charles W. Lynch (1851–1932), associate justice of the Supreme Court of Appeals of West Virginia
- Neil L. Lynch (1930–2014), associate justice of the Massachusetts Supreme Judicial Court

== See also ==
- Judge Lynch (disambiguation)
