= Fionán Lynch =

Irish politician and judge (1889–1966)

Judge of the Circuit Court
- In office 17 October 1944 – 1 June 1966
- Nominated by: Government of Ireland
- Appointed by: Douglas Hyde

Leas-Cheann Comhairle of Dáil Éireann
- In office 5 July 1938 – 12 May 1939
- Ceann Comhairle: Frank Fahy
- Preceded by: Patrick Hogan
- Succeeded by: Eamonn O'Neill

Minister for Lands and Fisheries
- In office 1 September 1928 – 9 March 1932
- President: W. T. Cosgrave
- Preceded by: New office
- Succeeded by: P. J. Ruttledge

Minister for Fisheries
- In office 14 December 1922 – 1 September 1928
- President: W. T. Cosgrave
- Preceded by: Seán Etchingham
- Succeeded by: Office abolished

Minister without portfolio
- In office 30 August 1922 – 14 December 1922
- President: W. T. Cosgrave
- Preceded by: New office
- Succeeded by: Office abolished

Minister for Education
- In office 1 April 1922 – 30 August 1922
- President: Michael Collins
- Preceded by: New office
- Succeeded by: Eoin MacNeill

Teachta Dála
- In office July 1937 – October 1944
- Constituency: Kerry South
- In office August 1923 – July 1937
- Constituency: Kerry
- In office May 1921 – August 1923
- Constituency: Kerry–Limerick West
- In office December 1918 – May 1921
- Constituency: Kerry South

Personal details
- Born: 17 March 1889 Cahersiveen, County Kerry, Ireland
- Died: 3 June 1966 (aged 77) Dartry, Dublin, Ireland
- Party: Fine Gael
- Other political affiliations: Sinn Féin; Cumann na nGaedheal
- Spouse: Bridget Slattery (m. 1919)
- Children: 7, including Kevin
- Education: St Patrick's College, Dublin; Royal University of Ireland; University College Dublin

Military service
- Allegiance: Irish Free State
- Branch/service: Irish Republican Army; National Army
- Rank: Brigadier-General
- Battles/wars: Irish War of Independence; Irish Civil War

Fionán Lynch (Irish: Fionán Ó Loingsigh; 17 March 1889 – 3 June 1966) was an Irish revolutionary, barrister, politician and judge of the Circuit Court from 1944 to 1959, Leas-Cheann Comhairle of Dáil Éireann from 1938 to 1939, Minister for Lands and Fisheries from 1928 to 1932, Minister for Fisheries from 1922 to 1928, Minister without portfolio from August 1922 to December 1922 and Minister for Education from April 1922 to August 1922. He served as a Teachta Dála (TD) from 1918 to 1944.

== Early life ==
Lynch was born on 17 March 1889 in Cahersiveen, County Kerry. He was the seventh of eleven children to his parents Finian Lynch and Ellie McCarthy, the master and mistress of the new national school in the townland of Kilmakerrin, near Cahersiveen, in County Kerry.

His father, Finian Lynch, was the younger son of Partalan Lynch, a stonemason, farmer and hedge school teacher, who had purchased some land from the O’Connell estate at Kenneigh in Kerry, between Cahersiveen and Waterville on the Ballinskelligs side of the road and north of the river Inny. His elder brother became a stonemason but Finian trained as a teacher in Dublin. His mother, Ellie McCarthy was the daughter of the teachers in the national school at Spunkane, near Waterville. She was born in 1853 and went to Dublin to train as a teacher.

== Education ==
He grew up bilingual, speaking mostly in Irish at home, but in English at school. He was initially educated in the parent's school in Kilmakerrin but subsequently went to St Brendan's College, Killarney and then, at the age of 14 in about September 1903, to the Holy Ghost Fathers School at Rockwell College, County Tipperary. In 1907, he finished for one year with the Holy Ghost Fathers in Blackrock College, Dublin. He had planned to study medicine, but in 1907, when he was 18 years old his father died and he did not have the money to pursue this career path.

Instead, when he was 18, he went to Swansea in Wales and taught in a parish school, not as a trained teacher, but as a well-educated young man, before returning to Ireland in 1909, where he started training as a teacher in St Patrick's College, Dublin. He graduated in 1911 as a primary school teacher and took up a teaching position in Dublin in April 1912, in St. Michan's School, Halston Street near North King Street, Dublin, by chance, within the area of his activity in 1916.

== Munster Hotel ==
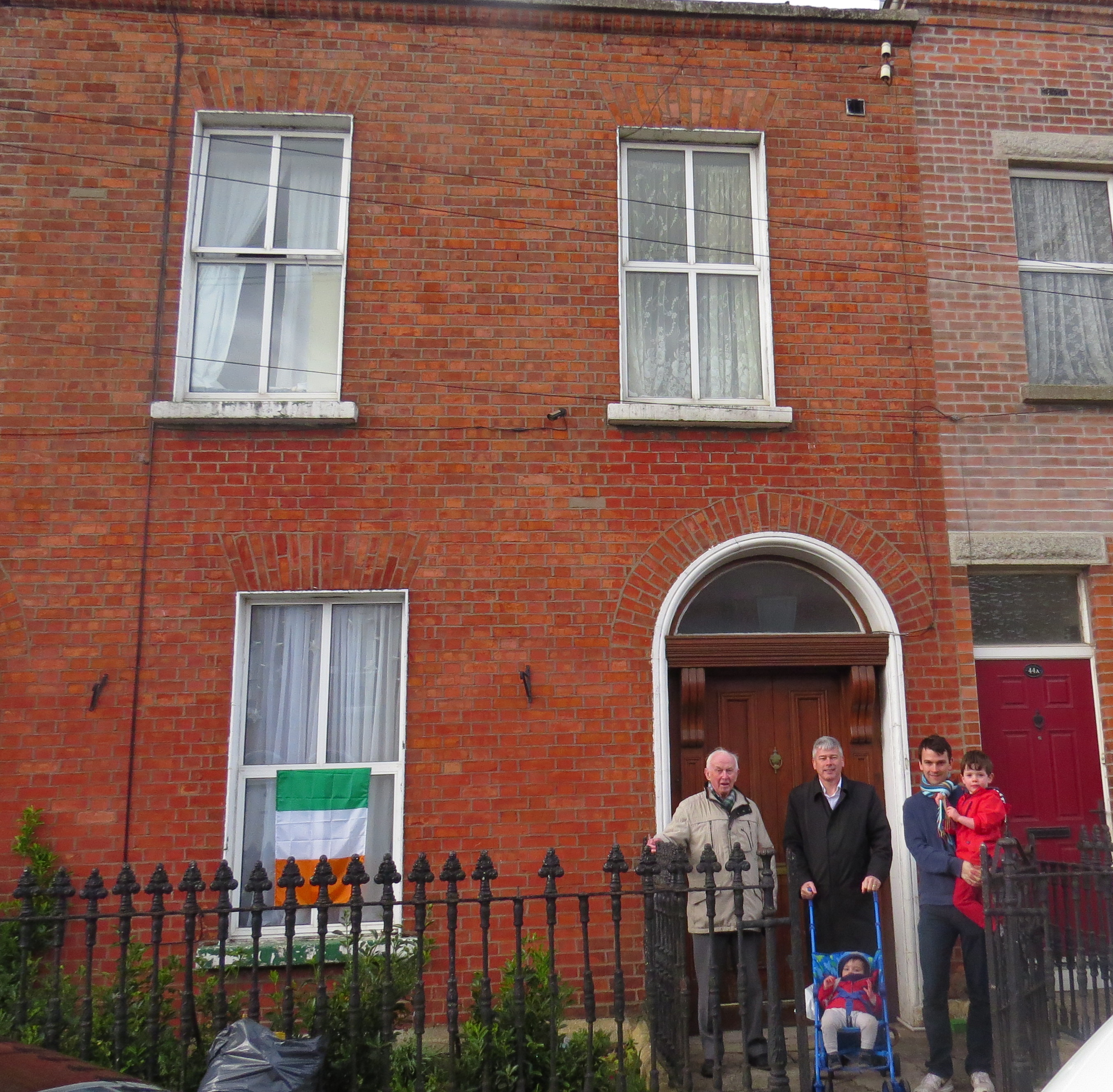
44 Mountjoy Street, on the occasion of the centenary commemorations of the Easter Rising, during the visit of Dermot Lynch (a son of Fionán Lynch); together with one of Fionán's grandsons; a great-grandson and two great-great-grandsons

While in training he met and became a lifelong friend of Gearóid O'Sullivan, a fellow student from Skibbereen, County Cork. Both having got jobs in Dublin, they arranged to stay at the Munster Hotel (also known as "Grianan na nGaedheal" or "Aras na nGael"), 44 Mountjoy Street, Dublin, the hotel and lodgings run by his aunt Miss Myra McCarthy.

This address would later become well known because Michael Collins, a first cousin of Gearóid O'Sullivan, stayed there after his release from Frongoch internment camp in December 1916 sharing a room with Lynch, with it remaining his base until 1922. Even after Collins went on the run he would still call in for breakfast and to collect his laundry. According to Lynch it was probably the most raided house in Dublin during 1920. During 1918, the British spy Timothy Quinlisk stayed.

== Gaelic League ==
While in Swansea, and keen on fostering the Irish language both written and spoken, Lynch had formed a branch of the Gaelic League. When he returned to Dublin in 1912 Lynch, Gearóid O'Sullivan and his friend Diarmuid O'Hegarty joined the very active and influential Keating Branch of the Gaelic League, where IRB influence was strong. The chair of the branch was Cathal Brugha and Piaras Béaslaí was a member, with Seán Mac Diarmada a frequent visitor. Lynch, O'Sullivan and Ó Hegarty were soon brought onto the committee of the branch and undertook teaching of both adults and children.

Lynch proceeded to the Royal University of Ireland and University College Dublin, where he got a BA in Celtic studies in 1913 and a Higher Diploma in Education in 1914. He had a story about his BA in Celtic studies whereby the university was short of an examiner fluent in the Irish language and sought the help, probably of the Gaelic league. He was registered as a student as Finian Lynch, the anglicised version of his name, and the recommendation from the Gaelic league for a suitable examiner was one Fionán Ó Loingsigh.

== Na hAisteoirí dramatic society ==
Piaras Béaslaí established a dramatic society which was called Na hAisteoirí (The Actors) and all three joined. They undertook plays around the country at social events such as the Oireachtas. Lynch translated Molière's “Le Maladie Imaginaire” into the Irish language for the purpose.

During 1914 to 1915, they produced plays in Irish at intervals in Dublin and in the summer of 1914 they did a tour of Cork and Kerry producing plays in different towns each night and finishing off with two or three nights at the Oireachtas in Killarney. In July 1914, they were producing Irish plays at the Oireachtas in Drogheda and Seán Mac Diarmada insisted that they go ahead even though it clashed with the Howth gun running.

== Irish Volunteers and the Irish Republican Brotherhood ==
On 25 November 1913, Lynch, together with Gearóid O'Sullivan and Diarmuid O'Hegarty attended the meeting at the Rotunda Rink for the founding of the Irish Volunteers and they joined on that first night. Drilling started within a couple of weeks, at the Foresters Hall on Parnell Square (Russell Square at the time) and instructors were chosen and Lynch was chosen to train a squad. In summer 1914, there was the first election of volunteer officers and Lynch was elected 2nd lieutenant of F Company, which would be placed in 1st Battalion.

With the formation of the battalion the captain of F Company, Piaras Béaslaí, was promoted to second in command of the battalion and, as Sean (Jack) Shouldice who was the first lieutenant couldn't accept the captaincy, Lynch was promoted to captain of F Company. His friend from the Gaelic League Diarmuid Ó Hegarty was made second lieutenant.

Soon after this he was asked by his close friend Seán Mac Diarmada, along with Con Collins, to join the Irish Republican Brotherhood. The IRB supreme Council were trying to ensure volunteer officers were members of the brotherhood and the fact that he was already friendly with Seán MacDiarmada made him acceptable. He subsequently took the oath and was sworn in around spring 1915. He was allocated to the Circle in Gardiner Street, with Diarmuid Ó Hegarty and Gearoid O'Sullivan members of the same circle.

From late 1914, Lynch and the other members of the Irish Volunteers came under observation by the Dublin Metropolitan Police. At the time, Lynch was an assistant teacher in St. Michan's School, and at the beginning of 1916 the Commissioners of National Education notified the school that his activities were not compatible with his teaching duties. Lynch's schoolmaster told him that his salary would be withdrawn if he continued his involvement to which Lynch surprised him by replying that he would consult with his superior officers about it. He did so and was ordered by Tom McDonagh to lie low and formally sever his connections with the Volunteers. However, during this time he organised a Sunday morning training squad centre at the headquarters of the Gaelic League, 25 Parnell Square, for members whose positions made it impossible for them to be openly associated with the Volunteers.

However, he continued to attend the meetings of the battalion council, where he was told which area would be occupied by his company at the forthcoming rising.

== 1916 Easter Rising ==
British Army intelligence file for Finian Lynch

Lynch fought in the Easter Rising in Dublin in 1916 in the Four Courts garrison with Commandant Edward Daly in North King Street.

On Holy Thursday he again went to the formation parade and re-took formal command of F Company. He was greeted back with cheers and excitement having previously told his men that he would be back to lead them when there was ‘anything doing’. On Easter Sunday Lynch and Gearoid O'Sullivan were at early Mass and got the Sunday Independent with the countermanding order and brought the bad news to Seán McDermott. The leaders were alerted, Lynch collecting Patrick Pearce from his home at Saint Enda's and a series of meetings were held through the day to late evening at Liberty Hall.

The decision to proceed with the Easter Rising having been taken, the First Battalion mobilised in Blackhall Place on the morning of Easter Monday under the command of Commandant Ned Daly. Lynch was stationed in North King Street, adjacent to the Four Courts, having previously reconnoitred the area on Good Friday, they were rapidly able to occupy their chosen houses, create barricades and arrange food supplies in line with their original plans. F Company occupied the area from North King St. along Church St. to May Lane where it was joined to C Company which held the Four Courts.

There was little fighting in the area until the Wednesday 26 April, from which point the fighting was intense, especially along North King Street, until the order for surrender on the Saturday. His final engagement was on Saturday afternoon at the barricade on the May Lane side of the Franciscan Church, during which Seán Hurley was fatally wounded.

Lynch and his men, who were worn out from fighting, retreated to the Four Courts on Saturday evening where they received the order to surrender shortly afterwards.

Lynch, describing the valour of his men said: "I shall merely say that it was a great honour for any man to be their captain. As to how they fought, the words of our enemies at the time are the greatest tribute we could call for". General Sir John Maxwell said of North King Street: "With the one exception of the place at Ballsbridge, where the Sherwood Foresters were ambushed, this was by far the worst fighting that occurred in the whole of Dublin. At first the troops, coming from one end of the street, were repulsed. And it was only when we made an attack from both sides that we succeeded, after twenty-four hours fighting, in capturing the street. The casualties were very heavy during this fighting".

After the surrender Lynch was sent to Kilmainham Gaol, where, on 4 May 1916, Captain Lynch was tried by Field General Court martial, sentenced to death but immediately had his sentence commuted to 10 years penal servitude. He was transferred to Mountjoy Prison and then spent a period in Portland Jail, on Portland Isle off the Dorset coast, after which he was transferred to Lewis Prison. He was released in June 1917 with the other Irish prisoners under the general amnesty.

== 1917–1918 ==
On his release in June 1917, his re‐employment was refused. He became an organiser for the Volunteer Executive, working in South Kerry, Armagh and Offaly, militarily as well as politically for Sinn Féin. He continued to preach about the benefits of Ireland becoming a republic and was soon drafted to East Clare for electioneering in the hugely significant campaign for the July 1917 East Clare by-election where Éamon de Valera, for Sinn Féin, beat the Irish Parliamentary Party candidate.

He attended the first Roger Casement Commemoration in Banna Strand, County Kerry, on 11 August 1917 where he gave a speech along with Thomas Ashe and Austin Stack before a crowd of 12,000.

Lynch was arrested on 13 August 1917 along with Thomas Ashe and Austin Stack under the charge of making seditious speeches and wearing the Volunteer uniform. They were each sentenced to two years’ jail and ended up in Mountjoy Prison, being treated as common criminals. With a few other republicans, they undertook a hunger strike. Unfortunately, this had a tragic outcome when, in September 1917, Thomas Ashe died after food was fed into his lungs during forced feeding. Lynch, returning from his own forced feeding had said to Ashe as they crossed paths ‘Stick it Tom boy’ to which he replied ‘I’ll stick it Fin’. Fionán Lynch records the fact that he was the last person to speak to Ashe before his death, as these were Ashe's last words.

The prisoners were released in November 1917, but Lynch was re‐arrested on 18 May 1918, along with most of those previously released on licence, this time the reason given was a ‘German Plot’.

== First Dáil and War of Independence (1918–1921) ==
In December 1918, Lynch stood as a candidate in the United Kingdom general election, being elected unopposed as an abstentionist Sinn Féin MP for Kerry South, becoming a Member of the 1st Dáil. Apparently his candidature was a surprise as, being imprisoned, Lynch had not been available to sign his assent to his nomination which had been done for him by Michael Collins, without troubling to notify his friend that he had done so. Sinn Féin won an overwhelming majority in Ireland at the 1918 general election, but did not take up their seats in Westminster in protest. The parliament met in Dublin in January 1919, but Lynch, along with many other members, was unable to attend being imprisoned at the time.

In April 1919, Lynch was transferred to Strangeways Prison, Manchester as a political prisoner. He was released from Manchester Jail "time served", again while on hunger strike, on 19 August 1919, and was met upon release by Paddy O'Donoghue, who passed onto him orders from Michael Collins. Lynch pointed out areas of the prison that were weakly guarded inside, including counting the number of bricks in the walls to estimate the height for the rope ladders. This led to the successful escape of the remaining political prisoners eight weeks later, including Austin Stack and Stack's father.

As TD for Kerry South he spent much time in the county on parliamentary and paramilitary activities. Many meetings were held in Tralee, in the premises of Thomas Slattery an active republican in his hometown who figured prominently in the movement.

In November 1919, Lynch married Bridget Slattery, daughter of Tom Slattery, having met at a republican meeting hosted by Tom Slattery in August 1917. After the marriage, which was conducted by his brother, Father John Lynch, he and Bridget got a flat at 98 Pembroke Road, Dublin leaving 44 Mountjoy Street.

After September 1919 the Dáil was declared illegal following which it met rarely, but its cabinet held meetings in various different locations across the city of Dublin, overseeing the guerrilla war that was being fought at that time against the British. He and Bridget hosted some of these cabinet meetings at their flat on Pembroke Road. He was appointed to the GHQ Staff of the IRA as assistant director of organisation under Diarmaid Ó Heigeartaigh in early 1920.

Around this time Lynch set up an insurance business and worked part-time as an organiser until his re‐arrest on 8 January 1921. He was interned in Ballykinlar internment Camp in County Down, where he was when his father in law died, and was released with the other TDs on 12 August 1921 to attend a meeting of the Dáil in Dublin on 16 August 1921. His business collapsed as a result of his internment.

== Second Dáil and Anglo-Irish Treaty ==
In the May 1921 elections, Lynch was re-elected as an abstentionist member of the House of Commons of Southern Ireland and a Member of the 2nd Dáil as a Sinn Féin TD for Kerry–Limerick West at the 1921 elections.

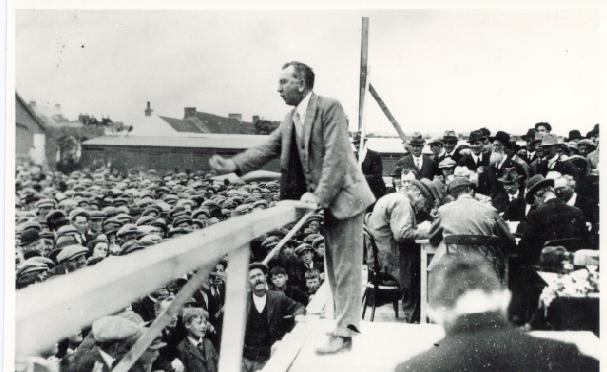
Lynch at an election rally in the 1920s

In October 1921, he was a member of the delegation that went to London to negotiate the Anglo-Irish Treaty with the UK, serving as joint secretary.

He supported the Anglo-Irish Treaty like almost all IRB members and during the Dáil Debates criticised some Anti-Treaty TDs. Lynch believed the Treaty to be the practical solution, arguing for it in the Dáil debates, saying that

I stand for this Treaty on four grounds, and the one I mention last is the one that will mean the most to me. I stand for it because it gives us an army, because it gives us evacuation, because it gives us control over the finances of the country, and lastly, and greatest of all to me, because it gives us control over our education.

Under the terms of the Treaty a Provisional Government was established in January 1922, with the task of overseeing the implementation of the Treaty and to be dissolved on 5 December 1922, one year after the signing of the treaty.

His position in this government from April 1922 to August 1922 was Minister for Education. This overlapped with the cabinet of the third Dáil and Lynch came to a pragmatic arrangement with Michael Hayes, the other Minister for Education at that time, whereby roles were divided between them, with Lynch taking responsibility for primary education. Lynch had the task of dissolving the education board which had sacked him from his teaching job after the Easter Rising.

== Irish Civil War (1922–1923) and Third Dáil ==
Under the terms of the Anglo-Irish Treaty, the Treaty had to be ratified by popular vote and the Second Dáil had decided that the 16 June 1922 general election, campaigned on the Treaty, would be that ratification. By April, there were increasing clashes between government troops and irregulars and, in late April, Lynch attended public rallies with Michael Collins in Killarney and Tralee to argue for the Treaty, despite significant harassment from anti-treaty activists.

Sinn Féin knew that the June election would split the party and in an effort to retain unity a Pact was drawn up in May 1922 under which it was agreed that both Pro and Anti-Treaty TDs would form a coalition government. The outcome of June 1922 election was strongly in favour of acceptance of the Treaty, both in the number of Pro-Treaty TDs elected and the votes cast.

However, there were continuing disagreements about the Anglo-Irish Treaty, combined with many acts of aggression against treaty supporters as well as National Forces leading ultimately to the civil war, with the shelling of the Four Courts on 28 June 1922 being a significant watershed moment.

During the Civil War he fought with the Irish National Army and rose to the rank of Brigadier-General. He enlisted in the National Army at Portobello Barracks on 12 July 1922, as a General Staff Officer in the General Headquarters Staff. By mid-summer the major cities were under government control and the Irregulars were concentrated in the rural areas of the province of Munster, particularly in the counties of Tipperary, Cork, and Kerry.

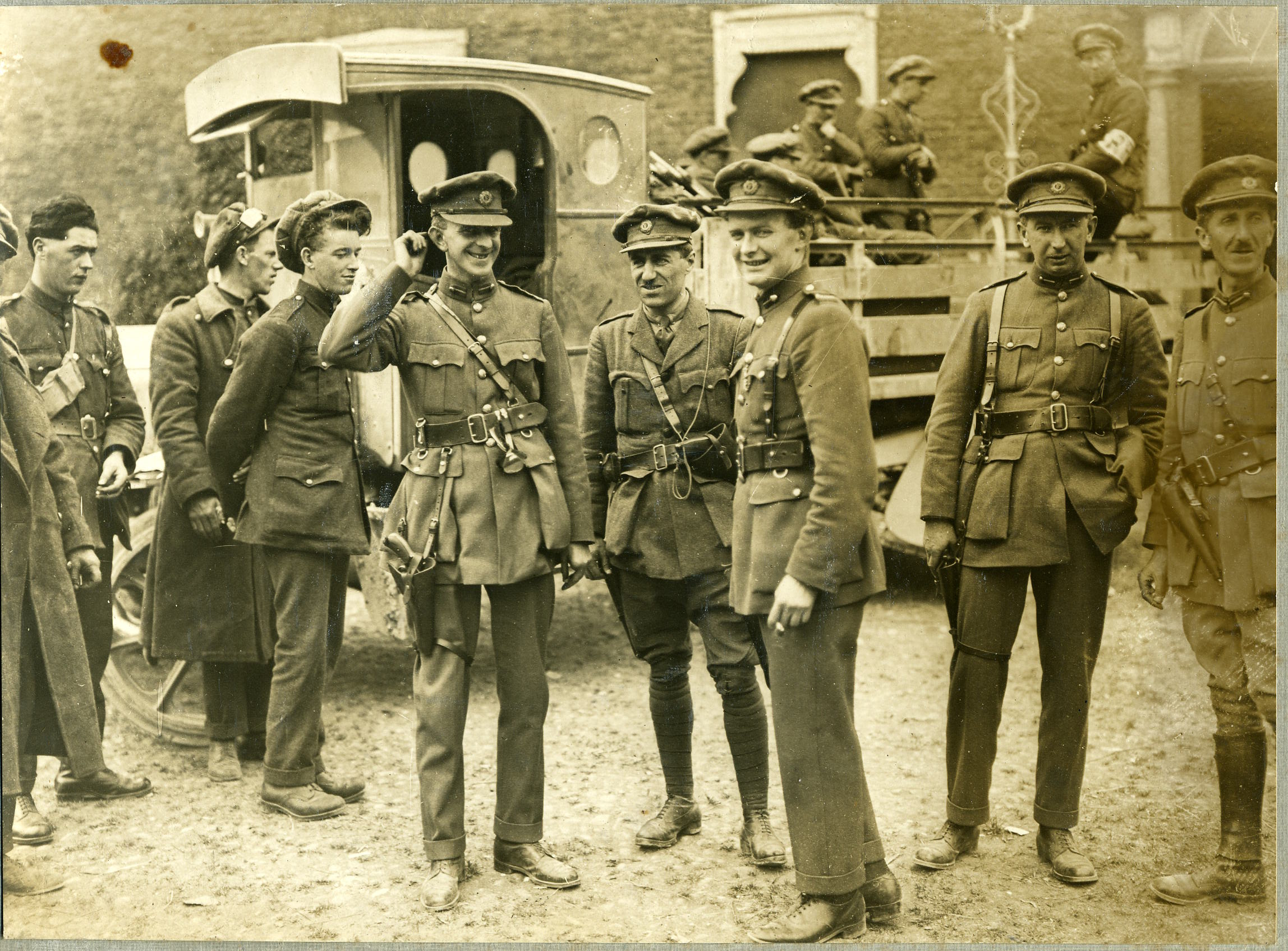
Lynch (second from the right) during the Irish Civil War

In July 1922, with the sub-division of the original military districts, Lynch was appointed by Collins a vice commandant of the South Western Division with the rank of commandant-general, commanding a unit of Dublin soldiers in County Kerry. He served in that appointment under General Eoin O'Duffy, General Officer Commanding the Division, up to 13 December 1922. He undertook trips to his constituency in Kerry and the rest of the county but the population of the county was heavily anti treaty and there was considerable danger. On occasion he had to endure being ambushed and, during one ambush, he was hit on a metal cigarette case which saved his life.

In August 1922, he travelled by car with Michael Collins as far as Limerick, where Lynch headed for his constituency of Kerry and Collins for Cork, but on 22 August 1922 Collins was ambushed and assassinated.

On Friday, 25 August 1922, Lynch, in command of a large force of Dublin Guards, set out for Kenmare to relieve and strengthen the garrison that had been established earlier in the month by Tom O’Connor-Scarteen. The geography meant that the Kenmare could only be supplied by sea and a land link was necessary. As Lynch's column advanced along the Killarney-Kilgarvan road it came under fire from anti-treaty forces at Filadown, near Glenflesk. This brought an ironic comment to Lynch, TD for the area, that his constituents did not seem to think much of him. As night fell, and following a number of wounded, the Free State column retreated, returning to the area the next day.

He was elected to the 3rd Dáil at the 1922 general election as a Pro-Treaty Sinn Féin TD and on 9 September 1922, Lynch was appointed as a Minister without Portfolio in the government of the Third Dáil, being unavailable for immediate service in the Government as he remained on active service.

On 5 December, legislation adopted by the Westminster parliament approved both the Free State Constitution and the Anglo-Irish Treaty of a year before, satisfying the British insistence that the Free State be based on constitutionalism and legislation rather than violence. On 14 December 1922, with the dissolution of the Provisional Government, Lynch became Minister for Fisheries in the Free State Government of W. T. Cosgrave.

On 6 December 1922, the day the Irish Free State came into being, two members of its legislature were shot by the Irregulars, one of whom, Seán Hales, was killed, as part of a retaliatory policy for the military court executions that had started a few weeks earlier.

Following the execution of the Four Courts IRA members, a threat was published that all pro-treaty TDs were legitimate targets for assassination.

However, the reluctance of former colleagues to attack him may have ensured his survival during the war – Frank Henderson of Dublin's No. 1 brigade of the IRA told Ernie O'Malley of his reluctance to become involved in reprisal shootings after Free State executions, commenting: ‘I didn't like that order. I could have shot Eamon Duggan and Fionán Lynch, for they went home every night drunk, but I left them alone.’ Although the civil war ended in 1923, Lynch was provided with an armed guard as late as 1932, because of the ongoing threat of assassination.

== Later life ==
The Military Service Pensions Act of 1924 aided post-Civil War reconciliation and, from October 1924 until October 1928, Lynch acted as a member of the Board of Assessors for the adjudication of military service pensions, along with Eamonn Duggan and Gearóid O'Sullivan acting as Secretary.

Lynch was re-elected at each subsequent general election as a Cumann na nGaedheal and later Fine Gael TD for the constituencies of Kerry from 1923 to 1937 and Kerry South from 1937 until 1944. Lynch served as Minister for Education from April to August 1922, as Minister for Fisheries from 1922 to 1928, and as Minister for Land and Fisheries from 1928 to 1932.

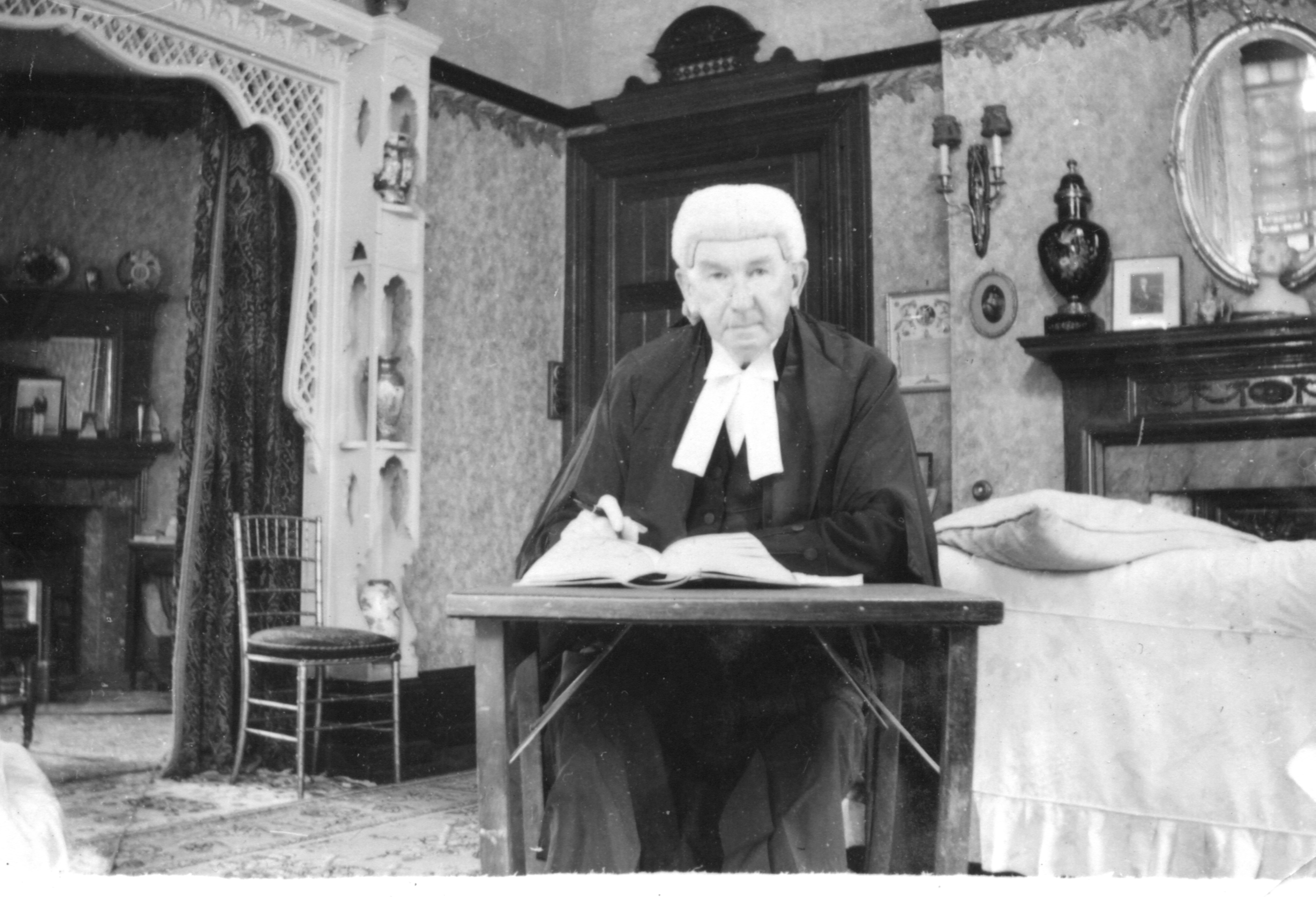
Fionán Lynch in 1948

In 1932, he was re-elected to his constituency of Kerry but the government was defeated by Éamon de Valera's Fianna Fáil. He had been called to the Irish Bar in 1930 and practised as a barrister in the Irish Midlands Circuit.

He managed to remain friendly with members of both sides and in 1937 he suffered a very severe heart attack. For the 1938 election he was unfit to canvas or undertake electioneering. The parties agreed to put forward only the number of candidates for which there were seats and he was elected unopposed. In 1938, he was appointed Leas-Cheann Comhairle (deputy chairperson) of Dáil Éireann but suffered serious illness and relinquished the post in May 1939. He continued as a TD until 1944.

Having built up a legal practice, he retired from politics in October 1944, when he was appointed a Judge of the Circuit Court, in Sligo and Donegal Circuit Court by his old adversary Éamon de Valera. Despite their differences on the Treaty, they remained good friends and de Valera attended his funeral in June 1966.

He retired from the bench in 1959.

== Family ==
He married Bridget Slattery on 26 November 1919. Bridget was the daughter of Tom Slattery of Rock Street, Tralee. They had six boys and one girl; with one son predeceasing him.

Tom Lynch qualified in medicine and practiced psychiatry and was Professor of Psychiatry at the Royal College of Surgeons, St. Stephen's Green, Dublin. Kevin Lynch qualified in arts and was called to the Irish bar, and finished his career as a Judge of the Supreme Court.

Fionán Lynch died at his home in Dartry, Dublin, on 3 June 1966, aged 77, shortly after celebrating the 50th anniversary of the Easter Rising. His papers are on permanent loan to Kerry County Library archives.

Parliament of the United Kingdom
| Preceded by John Pius Boland | Member of Parliament for Kerry South; 1918–1922 | Constituency abolished |
Oireachtas
| New constituency | Teachta Dála for Kerry South; 1918–1921 | Constituency abolished |
Political offices
| Preceded by — | Minister for Education; Provisional Government; Apr–Aug 1922 | Succeeded by Eoin MacNeill |
| Preceded by — | Minister without portfolio Aug–Dec 1922 | Succeeded by — |
| Preceded by Seán Etchingham | Minister for Fisheries; 1922–1928 | Succeeded by Himself as Minister for Lands and Fisheries |
| Preceded by Himself as Minister for Fisheries | Minister for Lands and Fisheries; 1928–1932 | Succeeded by P. J. Ruttledge |

| Dáil | Election | Deputy (Party) | Deputy (Party) | Deputy (Party) | Deputy (Party) | Deputy (Party) | Deputy (Party) | Deputy (Party) | Deputy (Party) |
|---|---|---|---|---|---|---|---|---|---|
| 2nd | 1921 | Piaras Béaslaí (SF) | James Crowley (SF) | Fionán Lynch (SF) | Patrick Cahill (SF) | Con Collins (SF) | Thomas O'Donoghue (SF) | Edmund Roche (SF) | Austin Stack (SF) |
| 3rd | 1922 | Piaras Béaslaí (PT-SF) | James Crowley (PT-SF) | Fionán Lynch (PT-SF) | Patrick Cahill (AT-SF) | Con Collins (AT-SF) | Thomas O'Donoghue (AT-SF) | Edmund Roche (AT-SF) | Austin Stack (AT-SF) |
| 4th | 1923 | Constituency abolished. See Kerry and Limerick | | | | | | | |

| Dáil | Election | Deputy (Party) | Deputy (Party) | Deputy (Party) | Deputy (Party) | Deputy (Party) | Deputy (Party) | Deputy (Party) |
|---|---|---|---|---|---|---|---|---|
| 4th | 1923 | Tom McEllistrim (Rep) | Austin Stack (Rep) | Patrick Cahill (Rep) | Thomas O'Donoghue (Rep) | James Crowley (CnaG) | Fionán Lynch (CnaG) | John O'Sullivan (CnaG) |
| 5th | 1927 (Jun) | Tom McEllistrim (FF) | Austin Stack (SF) | William O'Leary (FF) | Thomas O'Reilly (FF) | James Crowley (CnaG) | Fionán Lynch (CnaG) | John O'Sullivan (CnaG) |
| 6th | 1927 (Sep) | Tom McEllistrim (FF) | Frederick Crowley (FF) | William O'Leary (FF) | Thomas O'Reilly (FF) | James Crowley (CnaG) | Fionán Lynch (CnaG) | John O'Sullivan (CnaG) |
| 7th | 1932 | Tom McEllistrim (FF) | Frederick Crowley (FF) | John Flynn (FF) | Thomas O'Reilly (FF) | Eamon Kissane (FF) | Fionán Lynch (CnaG) | John O'Sullivan (CnaG) |
| 8th | 1933 | Tom McEllistrim (FF) | Frederick Crowley (FF) | John Flynn (FF) | Denis Daly (FF) | Eamon Kissane (FF) | Fionán Lynch (CnaG) | John O'Sullivan (CnaG) |
| 9th | 1937 | Constituency abolished. See Kerry North and Kerry South | | | | | | |

| Dáil | Election | Deputy (Party) | Deputy (Party) | Deputy (Party) | Deputy (Party) | Deputy (Party) |
|---|---|---|---|---|---|---|
| 32nd | 2016 | Martin Ferris (SF) | Michael Healy-Rae (Ind.) | Danny Healy-Rae (Ind.) | John Brassil (FF) | Brendan Griffin (FG) |
| 33rd | 2020 | Pa Daly (SF) | Michael Healy-Rae (Ind.) | Danny Healy-Rae (Ind.) | Norma Foley (FF) | Brendan Griffin (FG) |
| 34th | 2024 | Pa Daly (SF) | Michael Healy-Rae (Ind.) | Danny Healy-Rae (Ind.) | Norma Foley (FF) | Michael Cahill (FF) |

| Dáil | Election | Deputy (Party) | Deputy (Party) | Deputy (Party) |
|---|---|---|---|---|
| 9th | 1937 | John Flynn (FF) | Frederick Crowley (FF) | Fionán Lynch (FG) |
| 10th | 1938 | John Flynn (FF) | Frederick Crowley (FF) | Fionán Lynch (FG) |
| 11th | 1943 | John Healy (FF) | Frederick Crowley (FF) | Fionán Lynch (FG) |
| 12th | 1944 | John Healy (FF) | Frederick Crowley (FF) | Fionán Lynch (FG) |
| 12th | 1944 by-election | John Healy (FF) | Frederick Crowley (FF) | Donal O'Donoghue (FF) |
| 12th | 1945 by-election | John Healy (FF) | Honor Crowley (FF) | Donal O'Donoghue (FF) |
| 13th | 1948 | John Flynn (Ind.) | Honor Crowley (FF) | Patrick Palmer (FG) |
| 14th | 1951 | John Flynn (Ind.) | Honor Crowley (FF) | Patrick Palmer (FG) |
| 15th | 1954 | John Flynn (FF) | Honor Crowley (FF) | Patrick Palmer (FG) |
| 16th | 1957 | John Joe Rice (SF) | Honor Crowley (FF) | Patrick Palmer (FG) |
| 17th | 1961 | Timothy O'Connor (FF) | Honor Crowley (FF) | Patrick Connor (FG) |
| 18th | 1965 | Timothy O'Connor (FF) | Honor Crowley (FF) | Patrick Connor (FG) |
| 18th | 1966 by-election | Timothy O'Connor (FF) | John O'Leary (FF) | Patrick Connor (FG) |
| 19th | 1969 | Timothy O'Connor (FF) | John O'Leary (FF) | Michael Begley (FG) |
| 20th | 1973 | Timothy O'Connor (FF) | John O'Leary (FF) | Michael Begley (FG) |
| 21st | 1977 | Timothy O'Connor (FF) | John O'Leary (FF) | Michael Begley (FG) |
| 22nd | 1981 | Michael Moynihan (Lab) | John O'Leary (FF) | Michael Begley (FG) |
| 23rd | 1982 (Feb) | Michael Moynihan (Lab) | John O'Leary (FF) | Michael Begley (FG) |
| 24th | 1982 (Nov) | Michael Moynihan (Lab) | John O'Leary (FF) | Michael Begley (FG) |
| 25th | 1987 | John O'Donoghue (Note: O'Donoghue served as Ceann Comhairle in the 30th Dáil from 2007 to 2009.) (FF) | John O'Leary (FF) | Michael Begley (FG) |
| 26th | 1989 | John O'Donoghue (FF) | John O'Leary (FF) | Michael Moynihan (Lab) |
| 27th | 1992 | John O'Donoghue (FF) | John O'Leary (FF) | Breeda Moynihan-Cronin (Lab) |
| 28th | 1997 | John O'Donoghue (FF) | Jackie Healy-Rae (Ind.) | Breeda Moynihan-Cronin (Lab) |
| 29th | 2002 | John O'Donoghue (FF) | Jackie Healy-Rae (Ind.) | Breeda Moynihan-Cronin (Lab) |
| 30th | 2007 | John O'Donoghue (FF) | Jackie Healy-Rae (Ind.) | Tom Sheahan (FG) |
| 31st | 2011 | Tom Fleming (Ind.) | Michael Healy-Rae (Ind.) | Brendan Griffin (FG) |
| 32nd | 2016 | Constituency abolished. See Kerry | | |
