= Anglo-Irish Treaty =

1921 agreement which ended the Irish War of Independence

Articles of Agreement for a Treaty Between Great Britain and Ireland
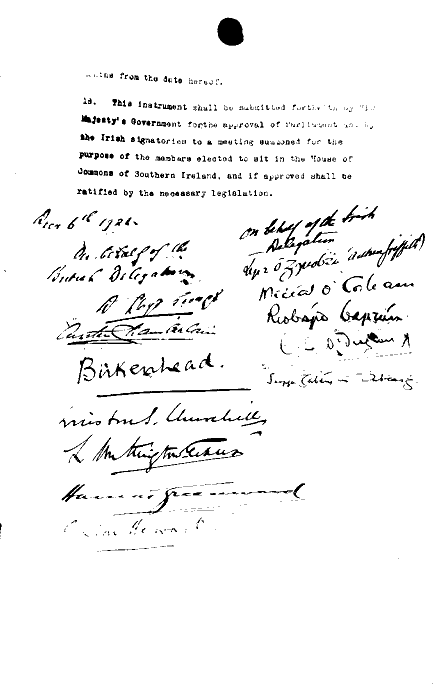
- Signature page
- Signed: 6 December 1921
- Location: 10 Downing Street, London
- Effective: 31 March 1922, fully implemented on 6 December 1922
- Condition: Creation of the Irish Free State, later Ireland
- Signatories: Irish Republic; United Kingdom of Great Britain and Ireland
- Languages: English
- Text of the Treaty

The 1921 Anglo-Irish Treaty (Irish: An Conradh Angla-Éireannach), commonly known in Ireland as The Treaty and officially the Articles of Agreement for a Treaty Between Great Britain and Ireland, was an agreement between the government of the United Kingdom of Great Britain and Ireland and the government of the Irish Republic that concluded the Irish War of Independence. It provided for the establishment of the Irish Free State within a year as a self-governing dominion within the "community of nations known as the British Empire", a status "the same as that of the Dominion of Canada". It also provided Northern Ireland, which had been created by the Government of Ireland Act 1920, an option to opt out of the Irish Free State (Article 12), which was exercised by the Parliament of Northern Ireland.

The agreement was signed in London on 6 December 1921, by representatives of the British government (which included Prime Minister David Lloyd George, who was head of the British delegates, and Winston Churchill, who was Secretary of State for the Colonies) and by representatives of the government of the Irish Republic (which included Michael Collins, who was Secretary of State for Finance, and Arthur Griffith, who was Secretary of State for Foreign Affairs). The Irish representatives had plenipotentiary status (negotiators empowered to sign a treaty without reference back to their superiors) acting on behalf of the Irish Republic, though the British government declined to recognise that status. As required by its terms, the agreement was approved by "a meeting" of the members elected to sit in the House of Commons of Southern Ireland and [separately] by the British Parliament. In reality, Dáil Éireann (the legislative assembly for the de facto Irish Republic) first debated then approved the treaty; members then went ahead with the "meeting". Though the treaty was narrowly approved, the split led to the Irish Civil War, which was won by the pro-treaty side.

The Irish Free State as contemplated by the treaty came into existence when its constitution became law on 6 December 1922 by a royal proclamation.

== Content ==
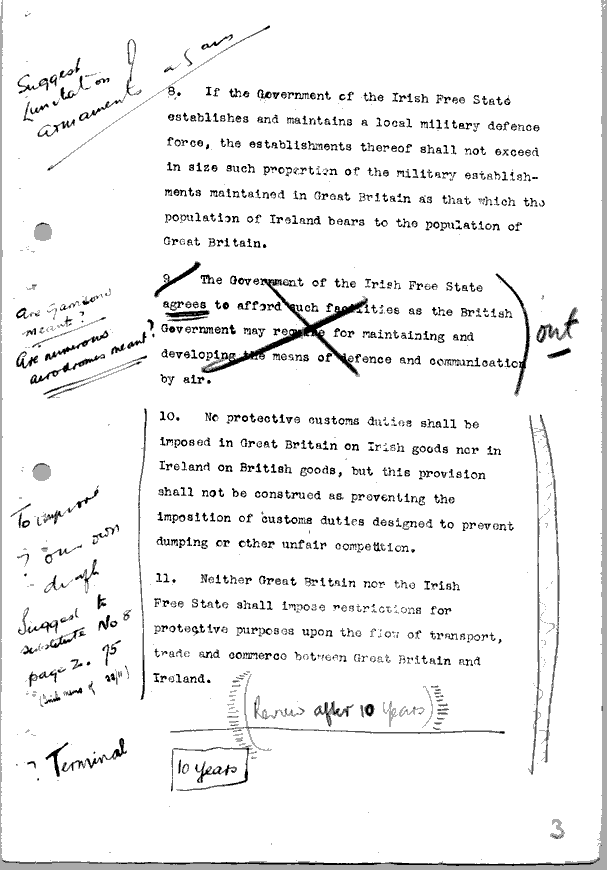
Page from a draft of the Treaty, as annotated by Arthur Griffith

Among the treaty's main clauses were that:

- Crown forces would withdraw from most of Ireland.
- Ireland was to become a self-governing dominion of the British Empire, a status shared by Australia, Canada, Newfoundland, New Zealand, and the Union of South Africa.
- As with the other dominions, the King would be the Head of State of the Irish Free State (Saorstát Éireann) and would be represented by a Governor General (see Representative of the Crown).
- Members of the new free state's parliament would be required to take an Oath of Allegiance to the Irish Free State. A secondary part of the oath was to "be faithful to His Majesty King George V, His heirs and successors by law, in virtue of the common citizenship".
- Northern Ireland (which had been created earlier by the Government of Ireland Act) would have the option of withdrawing from the Irish Free State within one month of the Treaty coming into effect.
- If Northern Ireland chose to withdraw, a Boundary Commission would be constituted to draw the boundary between the Irish Free State and Northern Ireland. The Northern government did not name a representative to the Commission as it did not consider itself bound by a Treaty which it had never assented to.
- Britain, for its own security, would continue to control a limited number of ports, known as the Treaty Ports, for the Royal Navy.
- The Irish Free State would assume responsibility for a proportionate part of the United Kingdom's debt, as it stood on the date of signature.
- The treaty would have superior status in Irish law, i.e., in the event of a conflict between it and the new 1922 Constitution of the Irish Free State, the treaty would take precedence.

== Negotiators ==
The negotiators included:

British side
Portrait	Name	Portfolio
	David Lloyd George (delegation chairman); MP for Caernarvon Boroughs	Prime Minister
	F. E. Smith, 1st Viscount Birkenhead	Lord Chancellor
	Austen Chamberlain; MP for Birmingham West	Lord Privy Seal; Leader of the House of Commons
	Winston Churchill; MP for Dundee	Secretary of State for the Colonies
	Sir Laming Worthington-Evans, 1st Baronet; MP for Colchester	Secretary of State for War
	Sir Gordon Hewart; MP for Leicester East	Attorney General
	Sir Hamar Greenwood; MP for Sunderland	Chief Secretary for Ireland

Irish side
Portrait	Name	Portfolio
	Arthur Griffith (delegation chairman); TD for Cavan and Fermanagh and Tyrone (MP for East Cavan and North West Tyrone)	Secretary of State for Foreign Affairs
	Michael Collins; TD for Armagh and Cork Mid, North, South, South East and West (MP for South Cork)	Secretary of State for Finance
	Robert Barton; TD for Kildare–Wicklow (MP for West Wicklow)	Secretary of State for Economic Affairs
	Eamonn Duggan; TD for Louth–Meath (MP for South Meath)	
	George Gavan Duffy; TD for Dublin County (MP for South Dublin)	

Providing secretarial assistance were:

- For the British:
  - Thomas Jones
  - Lionel Curtis
- For the Irish:
  - Erskine Childers
  - Fionán Lynch
  - Diarmuid O'Hegarty
  - John Smith Chartres

Notably, the President of the Irish Republic Éamon de Valera did not attend.

Winston Churchill held two different roles in the British cabinet during the process of Irish independence: until February 1921 he had been Secretary of State for War (minister for the Army) hoping to end the Irish War of Independence; from then on, as Secretary of State for the Colonies (which included dominion affairs), he was charged with implementing the treaty and conducting relations with the new state.

Erskine Childers, the author of The Riddle of the Sands and former Clerk of the British House of Commons, served as one of the secretaries of the Irish delegation. Thomas Jones was one of Lloyd George's principal assistants, and described the negotiations in his book Whitehall Diary.

== De Valera and the Status of the Irish plenipotentiaries ==
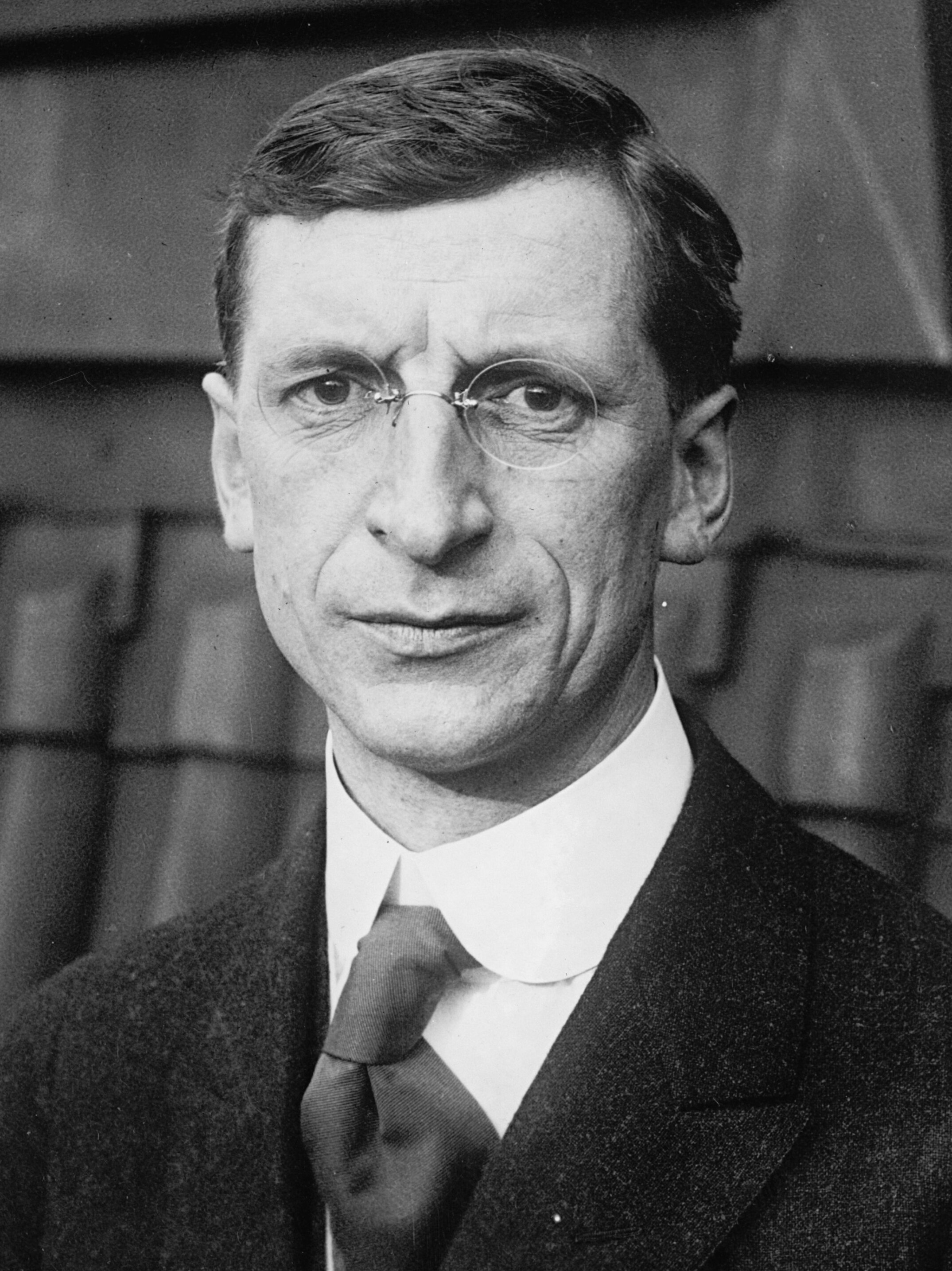
Éamon de Valera, who, as President of the Irish Republic, opposed the Treaty

In his book Thomas Jones states that in late July 1921 De Valera met alone with the British Prime Minister on four occasions. Concerning De Valera, Jones states: "What he chiefly seemed to want was Irish unity - that we should not impose partition, that there should be an All-Ireland Parliament...while leaving to Ulster the autonomy she now enjoys so long as she wishes to retain it."

De Valera sent the Irish plenipotentiaries to the 1921 negotiations in London with several draft treaties and secret instructions from his cabinet. Pointedly the British side never asked to see their formal accreditation with the full status of plenipotentiaries, but considered that it had invited them as elected MPs "to ascertain how the association of Ireland with the community of nations known as the British Empire can best be reconciled with Irish national aspirations". This invitation in August 1921 had been delayed for over a month by a correspondence in which de Valera argued that Britain was now negotiating with a sovereign state, a position Lloyd George continually denied.

In the meantime, de Valera had been elevated to President of the Republic on 26 August, primarily to be able to accredit plenipotentiaries for the negotiations, as is usual between sovereign states. On 14 September all the Dáil speakers unanimously commented that the plenipotentiaries were being sent to represent the sovereign Irish Republic, and accepted de Valera's nominations without dissent, although some argued that de Valera himself should attend the conference.

On 18 September Lloyd George recalled that:

From the very outset of our conversations [in June 1921] I told you that we looked to Ireland to own allegiance to the Throne, and to make her future as a member of the British Commonwealth. That was the basis of our proposals, and we cannot alter it. The status which you now claim in advance for your delegates is, in effect, a repudiation of that basis. I am prepared to meet your delegates as I met you in July, in the capacity of 'chosen spokesmen' for your people, to discuss the association of Ireland with the British Commonwealth.

On 29 September Lloyd George reiterated to de Valera that recognition of the Irish republic was "a recognition which no British Government can accord", and he repeated his invitation for talks on "ascertaining how the association of Ireland with the community of nations known as the British Empire may best be reconciled with Irish national aspirations", to start in London on 11 October, which was tacitly accepted by the Irish side. On 7 October de Valera signed a letter of accreditation as "President" on behalf of the "Government of the Republic of Ireland", but the letter was never requested by the British side. Both the Irish and British sides knew that, in the event of failure, the truce agreed in July 1921 would end and the war would inevitably resume, a war that neither side wanted. Three months had passed by with nothing agreed.

The ambiguous status of the plenipotentiaries was to have unforeseeable consequences within the Nationalist movement when it divided over the treaty's contents in 1921–22. Plenipotentiaries usually have full powers to handle negotiations as they see fit, but de Valera had given them explicit instructions to refer back to his cabinet with "the full text of the draft treaty about to be signed", and to await a reply before taking any further action. Prior to the signing of the treaty no messages or telegraphs were sent by the Irish delegation to Dublin. Thomas Jones was present at the signing of the Treaty and found it odd that Dublin was not consulted: "Strangely, no one, not even Childers, invoked the Cabinet mandate they had had the day before and no one thought to use the telephone to Dublin."

Subsequently, the anti-treaty side felt that the plenipotentiaries from the existing sovereign republic had somehow been persuaded to agree to accept much less. The pro-treaty side was to argue that after 11 October the negotiations had been conducted on the understanding that, even though the British were not negotiating with a sovereign state, the agreement was a significant first step towards Irish sovereignty.

== Negotiations ==
Days after the truce that ended the Anglo-Irish War, de Valera met Lloyd George in London four times in the week starting 14 July. Lloyd George sent his initial proposals on 20 July that were very roughly in line with the treaty that was eventually signed. This was followed by months of delay until October, when the Irish delegates set up headquarters in 22 Hans Place, Knightsbridge.

The first two weeks of the negotiations were spent in formal sessions. Upon the request of Arthur Griffith and Michael Collins, the two delegations began informal negotiations, in which only two members of each negotiating team were allowed to attend. On the Irish side, these members were always Collins and Griffith however Griffith had an ongoing illness which meant at times he had to turn over Irish leadership to Collins. Collins admitted that he did not have the temperament and experience for that type of diplomacy and that he lacked patience. On the British side, Austen Chamberlain always attended, though the second British negotiator would vary from day to day. In late November, the Irish delegation returned to Dublin to consult the cabinet according to their instructions, and again on 3 December. Many points still had to be resolved, mainly surrounding the form of an oath to the monarch, but it was clear to all the politicians involved by this stage that a unitary 32-county Irish Republic was not on offer.

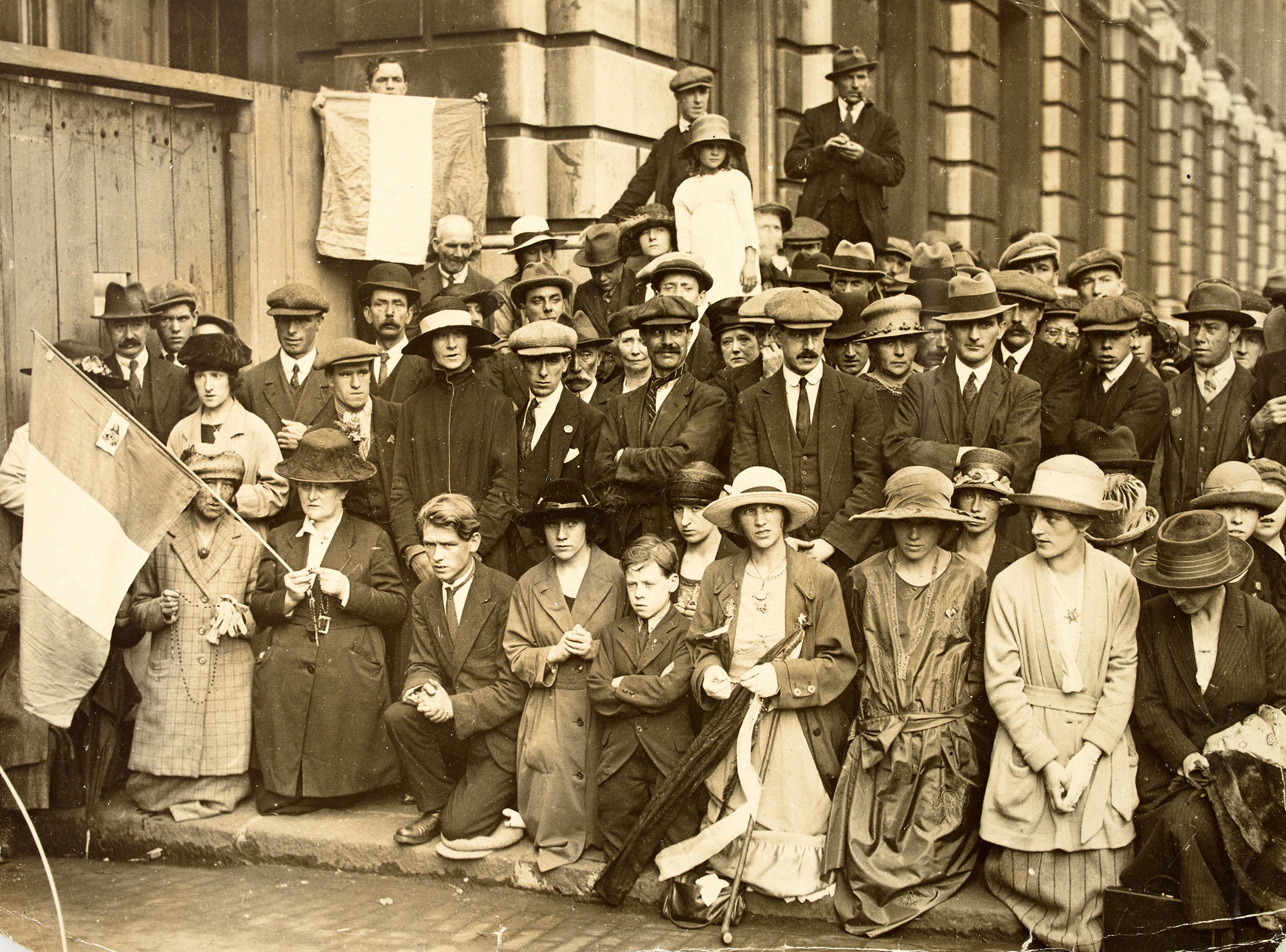
Crowds holding a prayer vigil outside Whitehall, while negotiations are underway inside

When they returned, Collins and Griffith hammered out the final details of the treaty, which included British concessions on the wording of the oath and the defence and trade clauses, along with the addition of a boundary commission to the treaty and a clause upholding Irish unity. Collins and Griffith in turn convinced the other plenipotentiaries to sign the treaty. The final decisions to sign the treaty was made in private discussions at 22 Hans Place at 11:15am on 5 December 1921. The Treaty was signed soon after 2 in the morning on 6 December, in the Cabinet Room at 10 Downing St.

=== British threat of war ===
Michael Collins later said that at the last minute Lloyd George threatened the Irish delegates with a renewal of "terrible and immediate war" if the Treaty was not signed at once. Barton noted that:

At one time he (Lloyd George) particularly addressed himself to me and said very solemnly that those who were not for peace must take full responsibility for the war that would immediately follow refusal by any Delegate to sign the Articles of Agreement.

George Gavan Duffy (a member of the Irish delegation) described the pressure placed on them to sign the treaty:

...the alternative to our signing that particular Treaty was immediate war...we had to make the choice within three hours and to make it without reference to our Cabinet, to our Parliament or to our people...We lost the Republic in order to save the people of Ireland.

Several months after the signing of the treaty (16 February 1922) Winston Churchill spoke in the British Parliament on the consequences the Irish delegation refusing to sign the treaty:

...if we had had to break off the Conference, destroy the negotiations, and embark upon what was literally the re-conquest of Ireland, at enormous expense in money and in men, to embark upon bloodshed, upon a far larger scale than anything that had ever occurred....

=== Irish leadership divided ===
Éamon de Valera called a cabinet meeting to discuss the treaty on 8 December, where he came out against the treaty as signed. That same day de Valera wrote a letter to the press which has been described as a letter to the Irish people:

"My friends Irishmen, you have seen in the public Press the text of the proposed Treaty with Great Britain. The terms of the agreement are in violent conflict with the wishes of the majority of the Nation as expressed freely in successive elections during the last three years. I feel it my duty to inform you immediately that I cannot recommend the acceptance of the Treaty either to the Dail Eireann or the country. In this attitude I am supported by the Ministers of Home Affairs and Defense."

The cabinet decided by four votes to three to recommend the treaty to the Dáil on 14 December.

The contents of the treaty divided the Irish Republic's leadership, with de Valera leading the anti-treaty minority. The main dispute was centred on the status as a dominion (as represented by the Oath of Allegiance and Fidelity) rather than as an independent republic, but the Partition of Ireland was a significant matter for dissent. Ulstermen like Seán MacEntee spoke strongly against the partition clause. The Dáil voted to approve the treaty but the objectors refused to accept it, leading eventually to the Irish Civil War. MacEntee was among their leaders.

== Approval and ratification ==
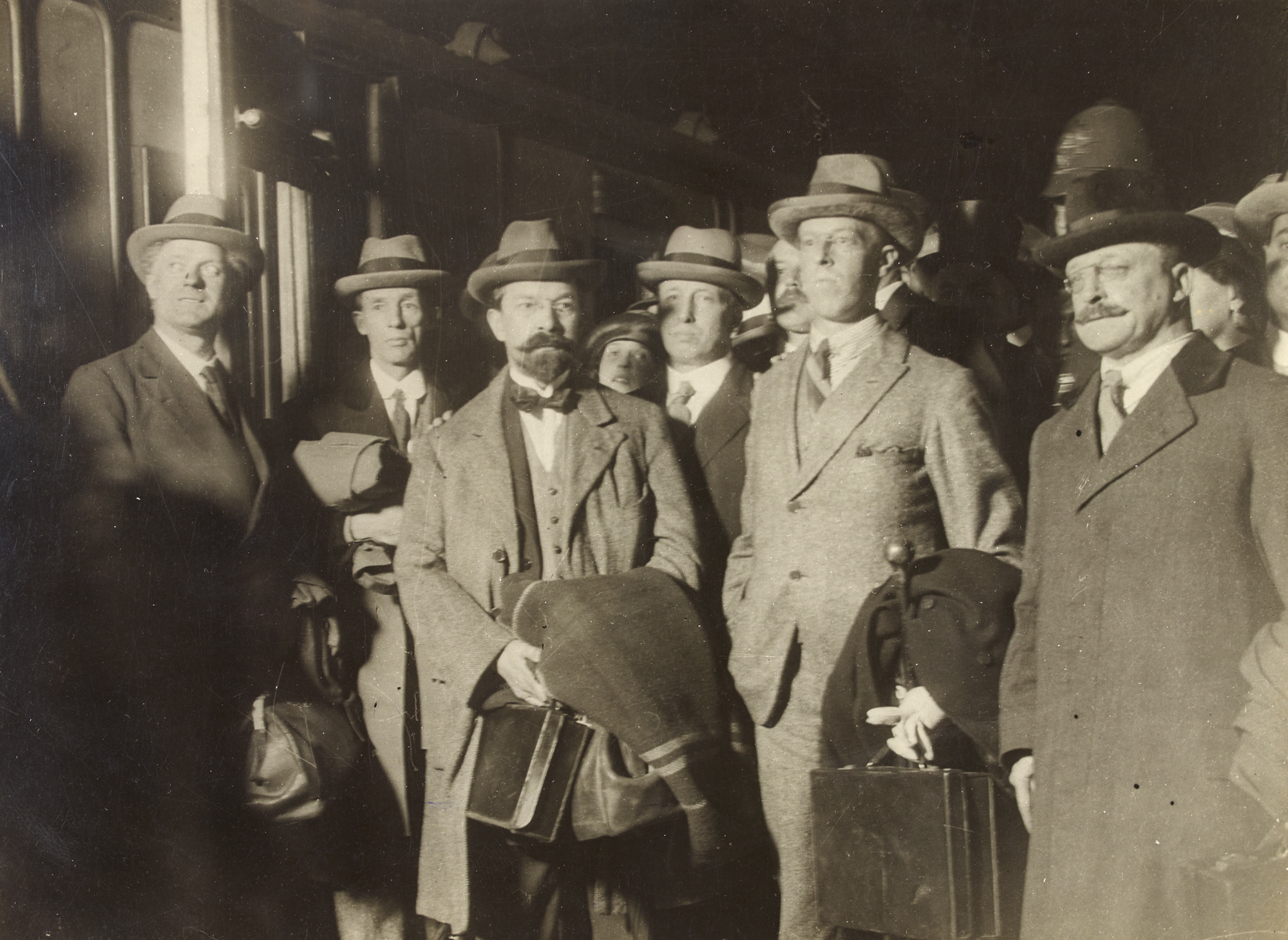
Members of the Irish negotiation committee returning to Ireland in December 1921

Under the terms of the treaty, it required approval by:

1. the Parliament of the United Kingdom, and
2. a "meeting summoned for the purpose [of approving the Treaty] of the members elected to sit in the House of Commons of Southern Ireland". This referred to the persons elected at the 1921 Irish elections called under the Government of Ireland Act 1920. This "parliament" had never in fact come into operation; of the 128 members elected, the 124 Sinn Féin candidates refused to sit in the House, instead forming (along with some of the Northern representatives) an alternative parliamentary assembly, the Second Dáil, which claimed to represent all of Ireland.

The British House of Commons approved the treaty on 16 December 1921 by a vote of 401 to 58. On the same day the House of Lords voted in favour by 166 to 47.

The Dáil approved the new treaty after nine days of public debate on 7 January 1922, by a vote of 64 to 57, but it was not the assembly specified in the treaty. Therefore, its approval of the treaty was not enough to satisfy the requirements of the treaty. The "meeting" required under the terms of the treaty was therefore convened. It formally approved the treaty on 14 January 1922. The "meeting" itself had a somewhat ambiguous status, not being convened or conducted in accordance with the procedures established for the House of Commons, nor being declared a session of Dáil Éireann. Anti-treaty members of the Dáil stayed away, meaning only pro-treaty members and the four elected unionists (who had never sat in Dáil Éireann) attended the meeting. Those assembled overwhelmingly approved the treaty, nominated Michael Collins for appointment as chairman of the provisional government and immediately dispersed with no parliamentary business taking place. This was the nearest that the House of Commons of Southern Ireland ever came to functioning; no other meeting ever took place, but the vote on 14 January, in strict compliance with the treaty wording, allowed the British authorities to maintain that the legal niceties had been observed.

In terms of the ratification of the treaty, the treaty required that "necessary legislation" be enacted to ratify it. The legislation required was enacted solely by the Parliament of the United Kingdom. The legislation enacted to do so was the Irish Free State (Agreement) Act 1922 which became law on 31 March 1922.

On 11 July 1924, the treaty was registered at the League of Nations by the Irish Free State.

=== Dáil debates ===
The Dáil debates lasted much longer and exposed the diversity of opinion in Ireland. The new Parliament fiercely debated the terms of the Treaty yet devoted a small amount of time on the issue of partition, just nine out of 338 transcript pages. Opening the debate on 14 December, President de Valera stated his view on procedure:

It would be ridiculous to think that we could send five men to complete a treaty without the right of ratification by this assembly. That is the only thing that matters. Therefore it is agreed that this treaty is simply an agreement and that it is not binding until the Dáil ratifies it. That is what we are concerned with.

However, when the treaty was ratified by the Dáil on 7 January, he refused to accept the vote as final, saying on 10 January that:

Anything that would seem to make it appear that that Treaty was completed by the resolution of approval here, we are against;

Secret sessions were held on 14 to 17 December, and on the morning of 6 January, to keep the discord out of the press and the public arena. During the first of these, de Valera also produced his ideal redraft, which was not in most respects radically different from the signed agreement, but which was probably not acceptable to the British side as the differing points had already been explored.

On 15 December, Robert Barton was questioned by Kevin O'Higgins about his notes on Lloyd George's statement about signing the agreement or facing a renewal of war: "Did Mr Lloyd George single Mr Barton out as the left wing of the delegation and did he say, 'The man who is against peace may bear now and forever the responsibility for terrible and immediate war?'" Barton replied: "What he did say was that the signature and the recommendation of every member of the delegation was necessary, or war would follow immediately and that the responsibility for that war must rest directly upon those who refused to sign the Treaty". This was seized upon by opponents of the treaty as a convenient proof that the Irish delegates had been subjected to duress at the last minute, and "terrible and immediate war" became a catch-phrase in the debates that followed. The next day, de Valera took up this point: "therefore what happened was that over there a threat of immediate force upon our people was made. I believe that that document was signed under duress and, though I have a moral feeling that any agreement entered into ought to be faithfully carried out, I have no hesitation in saying that I would not regard it as binding on the Irish nation."

The crucial private Dáil session on 6 January was informed that it could not be told about a private conference of nine TDs that had reached a compromise agreement on almost all points the night before. Most TDs wanted at least to be told what matters were still not agreed on, and from this point onwards the pro-treaty members insisted that all sessions should be held in public.

The public sessions lasted nine days from 19 December to 7 January. On 19 December Arthur Griffith moved: "That Dáil Éireann approves of the Treaty between Great Britain and Ireland, signed in London on 6 December 1921."

By 6 January, the day before the final vote, de Valera acknowledged the deep division within his cabinet: "When these Articles of Agreement were signed, the body in which the executive authority of this assembly, and of the State, is vested became as completely split as it was possible for it to become. Irrevocably, not on personalities or anything of that kind or matter, but on absolute fundamentals."

The Second Dáil ratified the treaty on 7 January 1922 by a vote of 64 to 57. De Valera resigned as president on 9 January and was replaced by Arthur Griffith, on a vote of 60 to 58. On 10 January, de Valera published his second redraft, known generally as Document No. 2.

Griffith, as President of the Dáil, worked with Michael Collins, who chaired the new Provisional Government of the Irish Free State, theoretically answerable to the House of Commons of Southern Ireland, as the treaty laid down. On 25 October 1922, a new Irish constitution was enacted by the 3rd Dáil, sitting as a constituent assembly; the British Parliament confirmed the enactment on 5 December 1922. This parallel enactment provided the legal basis for the Irish Free State.

The Treaty debates were held in private, and not published until 1972, "in all their aggression and rawness". They comprise a vital resource on the psychology of the Irish War of Independence and show the varying ideals that sustained the Sinn Féin deputies. Definitions of their understanding of their mandate in 1918 and 1921, and of the Republic itself, are interspersed with the practicalities of devolving power from London to Dublin. The narrow division led to the outbreak of the Irish Civil War on 28 June 1922.

== Outcome ==
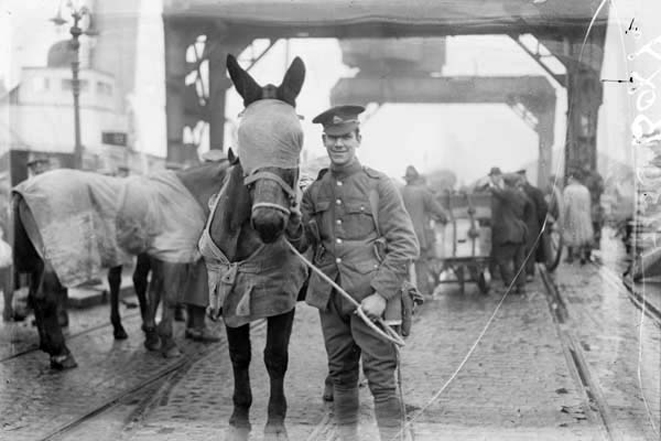
British cavalry soldiers leaving Ireland, 1922

The split over the treaty led to the Irish Civil War (1922–23). In 1922, its two main Irish signatories, Arthur Griffith and Michael Collins, both died. Birkenhead reportedly said on signing the treaty: "Mr Collins, in signing this Treaty I'm signing my political death warrant", to which Collins is said to have replied, "Lord Birkenhead, I'm signing my actual death warrant." Collins was killed by anti-treaty republicans in an ambush at Béal na Bláth in August 1922, ten days after Griffith's death from heart failure which was ascribed to exhaustion. Both men were replaced in their posts by W. T. Cosgrave. Two of the other members of the delegation, Robert Barton and Erskine Childers, sided against the treaty in the civil war. Childers, head of anti-treaty propaganda in the conflict, was executed by the free state for possession of a pistol in November 1922.

The treaty's provisions relating to the monarch, the governor-general, and the treaty's own superiority in law were all deleted from the Constitution of the Irish Free State in 1932, following the enactment of the Statute of Westminster by the British Parliament. By this statute, the British Parliament had voluntarily relinquished its ability to legislate on behalf of dominions without their consent. Thus, the Government of the Irish Free State was free to change any laws previously passed by the British Parliament on their behalf.

Nearly 10 years earlier, Michael Collins had argued that the treaty would give "the freedom to achieve freedom". De Valera himself acknowledged the accuracy of this claim both in his actions in the 1930s but also in words he used to describe his opponents and their securing of independence during the 1920s. "They were magnificent", he told his son in 1932, just after he had entered government and read the files left by Cosgrave's Cumann na nGaedheal Executive Council.

Although the British Government of the day had, since 1914, desired home rule for the whole of Ireland, the British Parliament believed that it could not possibly grant complete independence to all of Ireland in 1921 without provoking huge sectarian violence between overwhelmingly Protestant Irish Unionists and overwhelmingly Catholic Irish Nationalists. At the time, although there were Unionists throughout the country, they were concentrated in the north-east and their parliament first sat on 7 June 1921. An uprising by them against home rule would have been an insurrection against the "mother county" as well as a civil war in Ireland. (See Ulster Volunteers.) Dominion status for 26 counties, with partition for the six counties that the Unionists felt they could comfortably control, seemed the best compromise possible at the time.

In fact, what Ireland received in dominion status, on par with that enjoyed by Canada, New Zealand and Australia, was far more than the Home Rule Act 1914, and certainly a considerable advance on the home rule once offered to Charles Stewart Parnell in the nineteenth century albeit at the cost of the exclusion of Northern Ireland. Even de Valera's proposals made in secret during the Treaty Debates differed very little in essential matters from the accepted text, and were far short of the autonomous 32-county republic that he publicly claimed to pursue.

The solution that was agreed had also been on Lloyd George's mind for years. He met Tim Healy, a senior barrister and former nationalist MP, in late 1919 to consider his options. Healy wrote to his brother on 11 December 1919: "Lloyd George said that, if he could get support for a plan whereby the six counties would be left as they are, he would be ready to give the rest of the country Dominion Home Rule, free from Imperial taxation, and with control of the Customs and Excise." Healy considered that the idea had foundered on de Valera's insistence on having an all-Ireland republic, months before the war of independence became seriously violent in mid-1920.

Lloyd George had supported the 1893 Home Rule Bill and the slow process of the 1914 Home Rule Act, and liaised with the Irish Convention members in 1917–18. By 1921 his coalition government depended on a large Conservative majority, and collapsed during the Chanak crisis in October 1922.

== See also ==
- Anglo-Irish Treaty Dáil vote
- Irish Civil War
- Irish Free State
- Oath of Allegiance (Ireland)
- The Troubles in Ulster (1920–1922)
- Other treaties between Britain and Ireland:
  - Anglo-Irish Trade Agreement (1938)
  - Sunningdale Agreement (1973)
  - Anglo-Irish Agreement (1985)
  - Good Friday Agreement (1998)
  - St Andrews Agreement (2006)
- Comparable acts in Dominion nation-building:
  - New Zealand Constitution Act 1852
  - Canadian Confederation (1867)
  - Federation of Australia (1901)
  - National Convention (South Africa) (1909)
  - Indian Independence Act 1947
  - Ceylon Independence Act 1947
