= 1927 Dublin County by-election =

By-election to the 5th Dáil

- 24 August 1927
- Turnout: 57,424 (51.8%)
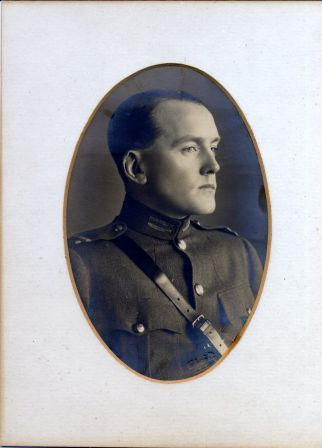

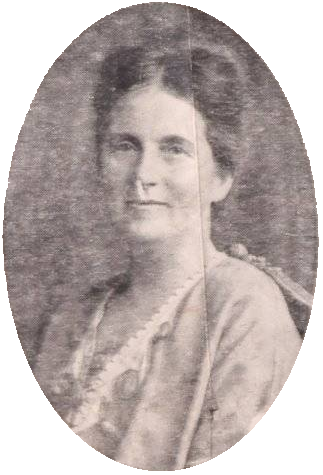
		Brennan
Nominee	Gearóid O'Sullivan	Robert Brennan	Kathleen Lynn
Party	Cumann na nGaedheal	Fianna Fáil	Sinn Féin
First preferences	39,966	16,126	1,332
Percentage	69.6%	28.1%	2.3%
TD before election
Kevin O'Higgins
Cumann na nGaedheal
TD after election
Gearóid O'Sullivan
Cumann na nGaedheal

A Dáil by-election was held in the constituency of Dublin County in the Irish Free State on Wednesday, 24 August 1927, to fill a vacancy in the 5th Dáil. Dublin County was an eight seat constituency comprising the administrative county of County Dublin.

Kevin O'Higgins had been a TD since 1918. He had been serving as Minister for Justice since 1922 and Minister for External Affairs since June 1927. He was also Vice-President of the Executive Council. He was assassinated by the IRA on 10 July 1927.

The writ of election to fill the vacancy was agreed by the Dáil on 2 August 1927. The Cumann na nGaedheal candidate, Gearóid O'Sullivan, had been a TD for Carlow–Kilkenny from 1921 to 1923. The Sinn Féin candidate, Kathleen Lynn, had been elected at the 1923 general election, but was defeated at the June 1927 general election.

On 16 August 1927, the 3rd Executive Council, led by W. T. Cosgrave, survived a motion of no confidence on the casting vote of the Ceann Comhairle. Following the vote, the Dáil adjourned to 11 October 1927.

== Result ==
The by-election was held on 24 August 1927. It was held on the same day as the 1927 Dublin South by-election, which followed the death of Constance Markievicz. The seat was won by Gearóid O'Sullivan. The by-election in Dublin South was also won by the Cumann na nGaedheal candidate.

1927 Dublin County by-election
Party	Candidate	FPv%	Count
Party	Candidate	FPv%	1
Cumann na nGaedheal	Gearóid O'Sullivan	69.6	39,966
Fianna Fáil	Robert Brennan	28.1	16,126
Sinn Féin	Kathleen Lynn	2.3	1,332
Electorate: 110,840 Valid: 57,424 Quota: 28,713 Turnout: 51.8%

== Aftermath ==
On the evening of 25 August, following the result of the by-elections, Cosgrave sought a dissolution of the 5th Dáil, which was granted by the Governor-General. This was followed by the September 1927 general election. The 5th Dáil is the shortest in the history of the state, lasting only 63 days.

O'Sullivan remained as a TD until his defeat at the 1937 general election, and later served in 1938 in the short 2nd Seanad. After the two by-elections in August 1927, Sinn Féin did not contest a Dáil election until the 1954 general election.
