= Kevin Lynch (judge) =

Irish judge (1927–2013)

Judge of the Supreme Court
- In office 15 April 1996 – 15 December 1999
- Nominated by: Government of Ireland
- Appointed by: Mary Robinson

Judge of the High Court
- In office 24 January 1984 – 15 April 1996
- Nominated by: Government of Ireland
- Appointed by: Patrick Hillery

Personal details
- Born: 24 June 1927 Dublin, Ireland
- Died: 31 October 2013 (aged 85) Croom, County Limerick, Ireland
- Spouse: Bernadette Lynch (m. 1957)
- Children: 5
- Parent: Fionán Lynch (father)
- Education: University College Dublin; King's Inns

Kevin Lynch (24 June 1927 – 31 October 2013) was an Irish judge and barrister who served as a Judge of the Supreme Court from 1996 to 1999 and a Judge of the High Court from 1984 to 1996. In 1984, he was the sole member of the Kerry Babies tribunal.

== Early life and career ==
Lynch was born in Dublin in 1927. His father, Fionán Lynch, was a member of the First Dáil and a judge of the Circuit Court.

He attended St. Mary's College, Dublin and completed a degree at University College Dublin; King's Inns would follow where he received the John Brooke Scholarship.

He was called to the bar in 1949, and became a senior counsel in 1970. His clientele were centred on the Midland circuit.

== Judicial career ==
=== High Court ===
Lynch became a judge of the High Court in 1984. In December 1984, he was appointed the sole member of the tribunal into the Kerry Babies case. He was among three judges who sat in a divisional High Court which heard an unsuccessful challenge by Des Hanafin to result of the 1995 divorce referendum. He heard the High Court hearing of Bula Ltd v Tara Mines Ltd (No 6) in 1996 which ran for 277 days.

=== Supreme Court ===
Lynch was appointed to the Supreme Court of Ireland in April 1996. He was delayed from sitting on the court as the Bula case had not yet completed.

He retired in December 1999.

== Personal life ==
He would marry Bernadette and have five children, followed in 2013 by his death in a nursing home near Croom, County Limerick, at the age of 85.
