= Gearóid O'Sullivan =

Irish politician and army general (1891–1948)

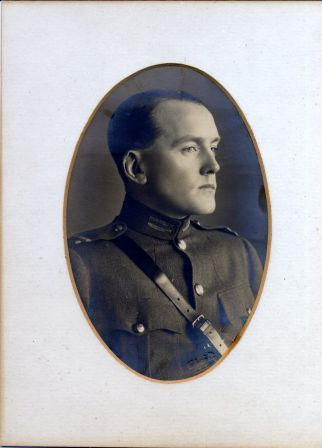
- O'Sullivan, c.1920

Senator
- In office 27 April 1938 – 7 September 1938
- Constituency: Cultural and Educational Panel

Teachta Dála
- In office August 1927 – July 1937
- Constituency: Dublin County
- In office May 1921 – August 1923
- Constituency: Carlow–Kilkenny

Personal details
- Born: Jeremiah O'Sullivan; 28 January 1891 Skibbereen, County Cork, Ireland
- Died: 25 March 1948 (aged 56) Dublin, Ireland
- Party: Sinn Féin; Cumann na nGaedheal; Fine Gael
- Spouses: Maud Kiernan; Mary Brennan
- Children: 4
- Education: St Patrick's College of Education

Military service
- Allegiance: Irish Republic; Irish Free State
- Service: Irish Volunteers; Irish Republican Army; National Army
- Years of service: 1913–1924
- Rank: Lieutenant general
- Commands: Adjutant general
- Conflicts: Easter Rising; Irish War of Independence; Irish Civil War

Lieutenant-General Gearóid O'Sullivan (28 January 1891 – 25 March 1948) was an Irish teacher, Irish language scholar, army general, barrister and Sinn Féin, Cumann na nGaedheal and Fine Gael politician.

== Early life and education ==
Jeremiah O'Sullivan was born in Coolnagurrane near Skibbereen, County Cork, he was the fourth son of Michael and Margaret O'Sullivan and given the name of Jeremiah - but known throughout his lifetime as Gearóid. His father, a native of Lough Ine, and his mother, née McCarthy, a Coolnagurrane native, were members of West Cork farming families. Early in his education at the local national primary school, his intellectual capacity and promise of greater things was often remarked upon. Despite his young age, he was selected school monitor – to monitor the progression of fellow students as well as the teaching capabilities of the teacher.

He next studied at Daniel Duggan's Intermediate and University School in Skibbereen; at about this time, he was to meet several individuals who would draw him further into the Irish nationalist movement and deepen his appreciation of Irish language and culture. These included James Duggan, a local Sinn Féin activist and acquaintance of Gearóid's cousin Michael Collins. The two shared a grandmother on the McCarthy side of their respective families. Duggan encouraged Gearóid to join the Gaelic League, which he did at the age of ten in October 1900. Gearóid's father, Michael O'Sullivan, chose to complete the family's 1911 Census form in Irish.

In 1909, O'Sullivan started at St Patrick's College of Education, in Drumcondra, Dublin, to train for a career in teaching. While not quite 19, he had already completed the second arts examination of the Royal University of Ireland. He took up teaching in 1911. A first posting was to Kildorrey, Cork in 1912, but soon transferred back to Dublin to teach at St Peter's National School, Phibsborough. He joined the Keating branch of the Gaelic League, quickly assuming a leadership role within the organisation and tirelessly travelling to teach Irish to League members while also studying for H Dip Ed at the National University and drilling with the Irish Volunteers. At 25 Parnell Square, the drill hall, he established the "faine" proficiency test for recruiting. It was also here that he became re-acquainted with Michael Collins, who joined the League in 1916 upon his return to Ireland from London, where he'd held a Postal Service position.

== Easter Rising ==
British Army intelligence file for Gerald O'Sullivan

In November 1913, O Sullivan was appointed to F Company, 1st battalion, said to be the best of Dublin Brigade. In addition to patrolling with the Irish Volunteers, O'Sullivan had the distinction shared by a small proportion of later "original IRA" members of being a member of the Irish Republican Brotherhood (IRB), which traces its roots to earlier revolutionary movements of the mid-Nineteenth Century. He also notably raised the Irish Flag over the General Post Office (GPO) in Dublin as fighting raged around the GPO and the streets of Dublin during the 1916 Easter Rising.

O'Sullivan, then 25, was the youngest IRB officer fighting in the GPO. He had been personally chosen by rebellion leader Seán Mac Diarmada to serve as his aide-de-camp. The additional honour of raising the Irish flag was given to him by another of the rebellion's leaders, Patrick Pearse. He married Maud Kiernan, sister of Kitty Kiernan, daughter of Peter and Bridget Kiernan of the Greville Arms Hotel, Granard, County Longford, with whom he had three daughters and a son. His wife died at age 40 and he remarried, to Mary ("Mae") Brennan of Belfast.

== Political career ==
=== War of Independence ===
Following the Rising, he was interned in Frongoch internment camp in Wales with Collins and others who, unlike the rebellion's leaders such as Pearse and Mac Diarmada, escaped execution. It was here that O'Sullivan's and Collins' friendship grew into a strong bond that would last until Collins' death in August 1922. O'Sullivan – a Celtic studies scholar – helped Collins polish his usage of the Irish language, "to gather some extent folklore and foster literature."

Upon release from Frongoch, Collins and O'Sullivan resumed their involvement with the Republican movement. Released in December 1916, he intensified his Volunteer activity with the Carlow Brigade, for which cover he retained work as a teacher at Knockbeg College. The Irish Volunteers became the IRA in 1919. O'Sullivan was arrested again. Sent to Mountjoy Gaol he went on hunger strike, which precipitated his early release in December. In February 1920, at Collins' request, O'Sullivan agreed to replace him as Adjutant General of the Irish Republican Army. Joining the Supreme Council of Irish Republican Brotherhood in November 1921, he was one of Collins' closest confidantes running many secret missions for Collins, who often referred to him as "George," his undercover nom de plume. He would accompany Collins to many pivotal meetings, often risking his own capture; indeed, at one stage, there was a £3,500 bounty on his head. In January 1922, he was made a Lieutenant-General in the new National Army, responsible for personnel and promotions.

At the 1921 general election, he was elected unopposed as a Sinn Féin Teachta Dála (TD) to the Second Dáil for Carlow–Kilkenny. He was re-elected at the 1922 general election as a Pro-Treaty Sinn Féin TD.

=== Civil war ===
During the Irish Civil War he served as adjutant general of the National Army. He did not contest the 1923 general election. On 28 August 1922, he was appointed to the newly created Army Council for the National Army. He was among the leadership who survived, Richard Mulcahy, Sean MacMahon, and Seán O'Murthuile. Other officers, led by Major-General Liam Tobin resented their favoured status, their perceived dilution of Collins republican ideals, and the employment of British officers as state advisers. O'Sullivan's appointment in 1923 as Adjutant-General had been sanctified by law in the Defence Forces (Temporary Provisions) Act.

=== Free State Period ===
After the war, he left the military to qualify as a barrister and build a career while spending time with his family with Maud Kiernan, which grew to include children Fr. Gearoid Jr., Sibeal, Ann and Sr. Trina. O'Sullivan had married Ms. Kiernan in November 1922; it was reportedly set to have been a double wedding of the Kiernan sisters Maud and Kitty Kiernan to O'Sullivan and Collins, respectively.

In 1927, after the assassination of the Minister for Justice Kevin O'Higgins, O'Sullivan, at the request of party leaders, contested the resulting by-election in the Dublin County on 25 August and retained the seat for Cumann na nGaedheal. He was re-elected in three subsequent general elections for the party in the same constituency.

In 1933 and 1934, O'Sullivan was a supporter of Eoin O'Duffy and the Blueshirts, a militant paramilitary organisation who combined with the National Centre Party and Cumann na nGaedhael to form a new party, Fine Gael.

O'Sullivan unsuccessfully contested the 1937 general election for Fine Gael. In April 1938 he was re-elected to Seanad Éireann but was unsuccessful at the July 1938 Seanad election. Following the death of his wife in 1940, when she was just 40 years of age, O'Sullivan commenced a government service career, followed by a private legal career.

== Death ==
O'Sullivan died on 25 March 1948, aged 56, and received a state funeral on the following Easter Monday – exactly 32 years after the Easter Rising. Thousands of people lined the streets of Dublin to watch as a horse-drawn carriage carried his coffin – draped in the same Tricolor that had covered Collins' coffin a quarter-century earlier – past the GPO and other landmarks to his final resting place at Glasnevin Cemetery. He died leaving a second wife, Mary Brennan of Belfast, and his four children.

== Bibliography ==
- National Archives of Ireland, Military Archive, Dublin.
- Coogan, Tim Pat, Michael Collins: a biography (1990)
- Hopkinson, M, Green against Green: the civil wars (1988)
- Manning, Maurice, Blueshirts (1987, ed., reprint 1988), p. 79, 95.
- O'Broin, Leon, In great haste: the letters of Mr Collins and Kitty Kiernan (1983)
- O'Halpin, Defending Ireland: Irish Free State and its enemies since 1922 (1990), p. 50.
- O'Mahoney, Sean, Frongoch: university of revolution (1989)
- Regan, John. M., Irish Counter-Revolution 1921-38 (1999)
- Ryle Dwyer, T., Michael Collins: the man who won the war (1990)
- Ryle Dwyer, T., The Squad and Operations of Michael Collins (2005), p. 130, 194, 206.

Dáil	Election	Deputy (Party)	Deputy (Party)	Deputy (Party)	Deputy (Party)	Deputy (Party)
2nd	1921	Edward Aylward (SF)	W. T. Cosgrave (SF)	James Lennon (SF)	Gearóid O'Sullivan (SF)	4 seats 1921–1923
3rd	1922	Patrick Gaffney (Lab)	W. T. Cosgrave (PT-SF)	Denis Gorey (FP)	Gearóid O'Sullivan (PT-SF)	4 seats 1921–1923
4th	1923	Edward Doyle (Lab)	W. T. Cosgrave (CnaG)	Denis Gorey (FP)	Michael Shelly (Rep)	Seán Gibbons (CnaG)
4th	1925 by-election	Edward Doyle (Lab)	W. T. Cosgrave (CnaG)	Denis Gorey (FP)	Michael Shelly (Rep)	Thomas Bolger (CnaG)
5th	1927 (Jun)	Edward Doyle (Lab)	W. T. Cosgrave (CnaG)	Denis Gorey (CnaG)	Thomas Derrig (FF)	Richard Holohan (FP)
6th	1927 (Sep)	Edward Doyle (Lab)	W. T. Cosgrave (CnaG)	Peter de Loughry (CnaG)	Thomas Derrig (FF)	Richard Holohan (FP)
6th	1927 by-election	Edward Doyle (Lab)	Denis Gorey (CnaG)	Peter de Loughry (CnaG)	Thomas Derrig (FF)	Richard Holohan (FP)
7th	1932	Francis Humphreys (FF)	Denis Gorey (CnaG)	Desmond FitzGerald (CnaG)	Thomas Derrig (FF)	Seán Gibbons (FF)
8th	1933	James Pattison (Lab)	Richard Holohan (NCP)	Desmond FitzGerald (CnaG)	Thomas Derrig (FF)	Seán Gibbons (FF)
9th	1937	Constituency abolished. See Kilkenny and Carlow–Kildare				

Dáil	Election	Deputy (Party)	Deputy (Party)	Deputy (Party)	Deputy (Party)	Deputy (Party)
13th	1948	James Pattison (NLP)	Thomas Walsh (FF)	Thomas Derrig (FF)	Joseph Hughes (FG)	Patrick Crotty (FG)
14th	1951	Francis Humphreys (FF)	Thomas Walsh (FF)	Thomas Derrig (FF)	Joseph Hughes (FG)	Patrick Crotty (FG)
15th	1954	James Pattison (Lab)	Thomas Walsh (FF)	Thomas Derrig (FF)	Joseph Hughes (FG)	Patrick Crotty (FG)
15th	1956 by-election	James Pattison (Lab)	Martin Medlar (FF)	Thomas Derrig (FF)	Joseph Hughes (FG)	Patrick Crotty (FG)
16th	1957	Francis Humphreys (FF)	Martin Medlar (FF)	Jim Gibbons (FF)	Joseph Hughes (FG)	Patrick Crotty (FG)
16th	1960 by-election	Patrick Teehan (FF)	Martin Medlar (FF)	Jim Gibbons (FF)	Joseph Hughes (FG)	Patrick Crotty (FG)
17th	1961	Séamus Pattison (Lab)	Martin Medlar (FF)	Jim Gibbons (FF)	Desmond Governey (FG)	Patrick Crotty (FG)
18th	1965	Séamus Pattison (Lab)	Tom Nolan (FF)	Jim Gibbons (FF)	Desmond Governey (FG)	Patrick Crotty (FG)
19th	1969	Séamus Pattison (Lab)	Tom Nolan (FF)	Jim Gibbons (FF)	Desmond Governey (FG)	Kieran Crotty (FG)
20th	1973	Séamus Pattison (Lab)	Tom Nolan (FF)	Jim Gibbons (FF)	Desmond Governey (FG)	Kieran Crotty (FG)
21st	1977	Séamus Pattison (Lab)	Tom Nolan (FF)	Jim Gibbons (FF)	Liam Aylward (FF)	Kieran Crotty (FG)
22nd	1981	Séamus Pattison (Lab)	Tom Nolan (FF)	Desmond Governey (FG)	Liam Aylward (FF)	Kieran Crotty (FG)
23rd	1982 (Feb)	Séamus Pattison (Lab)	Jim Gibbons (FF)	Desmond Governey (FG)	Liam Aylward (FF)	Kieran Crotty (FG)
24th	1982 (Nov)	Séamus Pattison (Lab)	M. J. Nolan (FF)	Dick Dowling (FG)	Liam Aylward (FF)	Kieran Crotty (FG)
25th	1987	Séamus Pattison (Lab)	M. J. Nolan (FF)	Martin Gibbons (PDs)	Liam Aylward (FF)	Kieran Crotty (FG)
26th	1989	Séamus Pattison (Lab)	M. J. Nolan (FF)	Phil Hogan (FG)	Liam Aylward (FF)	John Browne (FG)
27th	1992	Séamus Pattison (Lab)	M. J. Nolan (FF)	Phil Hogan (FG)	Liam Aylward (FF)	John Browne (FG)
28th	1997	Séamus Pattison (Lab)	John McGuinness (FF)	Phil Hogan (FG)	Liam Aylward (FF)	John Browne (FG)
29th	2002	Séamus Pattison (Lab)	John McGuinness (FF)	Phil Hogan (FG)	Liam Aylward (FF)	M. J. Nolan (FF)
30th	2007	Mary White (GP)	John McGuinness (FF)	Phil Hogan (FG)	Bobby Aylward (FF)	M. J. Nolan (FF)
31st	2011	Ann Phelan (Lab)	John McGuinness (FF)	Phil Hogan (FG)	John Paul Phelan (FG)	Pat Deering (FG)
31st	2015 by-election	Ann Phelan (Lab)	John McGuinness (FF)	Bobby Aylward (FF)	John Paul Phelan (FG)	Pat Deering (FG)
32nd	2016	Kathleen Funchion (SF)	John McGuinness (FF)	Bobby Aylward (FF)	John Paul Phelan (FG)	Pat Deering (FG)
33rd	2020	Kathleen Funchion (SF)	John McGuinness (FF)	Jennifer Murnane O'Connor (FF)	John Paul Phelan (FG)	Malcolm Noonan (GP)
34th	2024	Natasha Newsome Drennan (SF)	John McGuinness (FF)	Jennifer Murnane O'Connor (FF)	Catherine Callaghan (FG)	Peter "Chap" Cleere (FF)

Dáil	Election	Deputy (Party)	Deputy (Party)	Deputy (Party)	Deputy (Party)	Deputy (Party)	Deputy (Party)	Deputy (Party)	Deputy (Party)
2nd	1921	Michael Derham (SF)	George Gavan Duffy (SF)	Séamus Dwyer (SF)	Desmond FitzGerald (SF)	Frank Lawless (SF)	Margaret Pearse (SF)	6 seats 1921–1923	
3rd	1922	Michael Derham (PT-SF)	George Gavan Duffy (PT-SF)	Thomas Johnson (Lab)	Desmond FitzGerald (PT-SF)	Darrell Figgis (Ind)	John Rooney (FP)	6 seats 1921–1923	
4th	1923	Michael Derham (CnaG)	Bryan Cooper (Ind)	Thomas Johnson (Lab)	Desmond FitzGerald (CnaG)	Darrell Figgis (Ind)	John Good (Ind)	Kathleen Lynn (Rep)	Kevin O'Higgins (CnaG)
4th	1924 by-election	Batt O'Connor (CnaG)	Bryan Cooper (Ind)	Thomas Johnson (Lab)	Desmond FitzGerald (CnaG)	Darrell Figgis (Ind)	John Good (Ind)	Kathleen Lynn (Rep)	Kevin O'Higgins (CnaG)
4th	1926 by-election	Batt O'Connor (CnaG)	Bryan Cooper (Ind)	Thomas Johnson (Lab)	Desmond FitzGerald (CnaG)	William Norton (Lab)	John Good (Ind)	Kathleen Lynn (Rep)	Kevin O'Higgins (CnaG)
5th	1927 (Jun)	Batt O'Connor (CnaG)	Bryan Cooper (Ind)	Thomas Johnson (Lab)	Desmond FitzGerald (CnaG)	Patrick Belton (FF)	John Good (Ind)	Seán MacEntee (FF)	Kevin O'Higgins (CnaG)
5th	1927 by-election	Batt O'Connor (CnaG)	Bryan Cooper (Ind)	Thomas Johnson (Lab)	Desmond FitzGerald (CnaG)	Patrick Belton (FF)	John Good (Ind)	Seán MacEntee (FF)	Gearóid O'Sullivan (CnaG)
6th	1927 (Sep)	Batt O'Connor (CnaG)	Bryan Cooper (CnaG)	Joseph Murphy (Ind)	Desmond FitzGerald (CnaG)	Seán Brady (FF)	John Good (Ind)	Seán MacEntee (FF)	Gearóid O'Sullivan (CnaG)
6th	1930 by-election	Batt O'Connor (CnaG)	Thomas Finlay (CnaG)	Joseph Murphy (Ind)	Desmond FitzGerald (CnaG)	Seán Brady (FF)	John Good (Ind)	Seán MacEntee (FF)	Gearóid O'Sullivan (CnaG)
7th	1932	Batt O'Connor (CnaG)	Thomas Finlay (CnaG)	Patrick Curran (Lab)	Henry Dockrell (CnaG)	Seán Brady (FF)	John Good (Ind)	Seán MacEntee (FF)	Gearóid O'Sullivan (CnaG)
8th	1933	Batt O'Connor (CnaG)	John A. Costello (CnaG)	Margaret Mary Pearse (FF)	Henry Dockrell (CnaG)	Seán Brady (FF)	John Good (Ind)	Seán MacEntee (FF)	Gearóid O'Sullivan (CnaG)
8th	1935 by-election	Cecil Lavery (FG)	John A. Costello (CnaG)	Margaret Mary Pearse (FF)	Henry Dockrell (CnaG)	Seán Brady (FF)	John Good (Ind)	Seán MacEntee (FF)	Gearóid O'Sullivan (CnaG)
9th	1937	Cecil Lavery (FG)	Henry Dockrell (FG)	Gerrard McGowan (Lab)	Patrick Fogarty (FF)	Seán Brady (FF)	5 seats 1937–1948		
10th	1938	Patrick Belton (FG)	Henry Dockrell (FG)	Thomas Mullen (FF)	Patrick Fogarty (FF)	Seán Brady (FF)	5 seats 1937–1948		
11th	1943	Liam Cosgrave (FG)	Henry Dockrell (FG)	James Tunney (Lab)	Patrick Fogarty (FF)	Seán Brady (FF)	5 seats 1937–1948		
12th	1944	Liam Cosgrave (FG)	Henry Dockrell (FG)	Patrick Burke (FF)	Patrick Fogarty (FF)	Seán Brady (FF)	5 seats 1937–1948		
12th	1947 by-election	Liam Cosgrave (FG)	Henry Dockrell (FG)	Patrick Burke (FF)	Seán MacBride (CnaP)	Seán Brady (FF)	5 seats 1937–1948		
13th	1948	Éamon Rooney (FG)	Seán Dunne (Lab)	Patrick Burke (FF)	3 seats 1948–1961				
14th	1951	Éamon Rooney (FG)	Seán Dunne (Lab)	Patrick Burke (FF)	3 seats 1948–1961				
15th	1954	Éamon Rooney (FG)	Seán Dunne (Lab)	Patrick Burke (FF)	3 seats 1948–1961				
16th	1957	Éamon Rooney (FG)	Kevin Boland (FF)	Patrick Burke (FF)	3 seats 1948–1961				
17th	1961	Éamon Rooney (FG)	Kevin Boland (FF)	Patrick Burke (FF)	Mark Clinton (FG)	Seán Dunne (Ind)	5 seats 1961–1969		
18th	1965	Des Foley (FF)	Kevin Boland (FF)	Patrick Burke (FF)	Mark Clinton (FG)	Seán Dunne (Lab)	5 seats 1961–1969		
19th	1969	Constituency abolished. See Dublin County North and Dublin County South							
