= 16th Dáil =

TDs from 1957 to 1961

←	15th Dáil	17th Dáil	→

Overview
- Legislative body: Dáil Éireann
- Jurisdiction: Ireland
- Meeting place: Leinster House
- Term: 20 March 1957 – 1 September 1961
- Election: 1957 general election
- Government: 8th government of Ireland (1957–1959); 9th government of Ireland (1959–1961)
- Members: 147
- Ceann Comhairle: Patrick Hogan
- Taoiseach: Seán Lemass — Éamon de Valera until 23 June 1959
- Tánaiste: Seán MacEntee — Seán Lemass until 23 June 1959
- Chief Whip: Donnchadh Ó Briain
- Leader of the Opposition: James Dillon — John A. Costello until 21 October 1959

Sessions
- 1st: 20 March 1957 – 4 July 1957
- 2nd: 23 October 1957 – 17 July 1958
- 3rd: 22 October 1958 – 23 July 1959
- 4th: 21 October 1959 – 20 July 1960
- 5th: 26 October 1960 – 1 September 1961

The 16th Dáil was elected at the 1957 general election on 5 March 1957 and met on 20 March 1957. The members of Dáil Éireann, the house of representatives of the Oireachtas (legislature) of Ireland, are known as TDs. It sat with the 9th Seanad as the two Houses of the Oireachtas.

The 16th Dáil saw a change of Taoiseach from Éamon de Valera to Seán Lemass in June 1959. On 8 September 1961, President Éamon de Valera dissolved the Dáil on the request of Taoiseach Seán Lemass. The 16th Dáil lasted 4 years, 165 days.

== Composition of the 16th Dáil ==
- 8th, 9th government

Party	Mar. 1957	Sep. 1961	Change
Fianna Fáil	78	75	▼3
Fine Gael	40	41	▲1
Labour	12	11	▼1
Sinn Féin	4	4	Steady
Clann na Talmhan	3	3	Steady
Clann na Poblachta	1	1	Steady
National Progressive Democrats	—N/a	2	▲2
Independent	9	7	▼2
Ceann Comhairle	—N/a	1	▲1
Vacant	—N/a	2	▲2
Total	147		

In line with its policy of abstentionism, the Sinn Féin TDs did not take their seats.

Fianna Fáil, denoted with a bullet formed the 8th government of Ireland led by Éamon de Valera as Taoiseach. Following de Valera's election as president of Ireland in June 1959, Seán Lemass formed the 9th government of Ireland.

=== Graphical representation ===
This is a graphical comparison of party strengths in the 16th Dáil from March 1957. This was not the official seating plan.

== Ceann Comhairle ==
On the meeting of the Dáil, Patrick Hogan (Lab), who had served as Ceann Comhairle since 1951, was proposed by John A. Costello (FG) and seconded by Éamon de Valera (FF) for the position. His election was approved without a vote.

== TDs by constituency ==
The list of the 147 TDs elected, is given in alphabetical order by Dáil constituency.

Members of the 16th Dáil
Constituency	Name	Party
Carlow–Kilkenny	Patrick Crotty	Fine Gael
Carlow–Kilkenny	Jim Gibbons	Fianna Fáil
Carlow–Kilkenny	Joseph Hughes	Fine Gael
Carlow–Kilkenny	Francis Humphreys	Fianna Fáil
Carlow–Kilkenny	Martin Medlar	Fianna Fáil
Cavan	Patrick O'Reilly	Fine Gael
Cavan	Michael Sheridan	Fianna Fáil
Cavan	Paddy Smith	Fianna Fáil
Cavan	John Tully	Clann na Poblachta
Clare	Éamon de Valera	Fianna Fáil
Clare	Patrick Hillery	Fianna Fáil
Clare	Patrick Hogan	Labour
Clare	William Murphy	Fine Gael
Cork Borough	Stephen Barrett	Fine Gael
Cork Borough	Seán Casey	Labour
Cork Borough	John Galvin	Fianna Fáil
Cork Borough	Gus Healy	Fianna Fáil
Cork Borough	Jack Lynch	Fianna Fáil
Cork East	Richard Barry	Fine Gael
Cork East	Martin Corry	Fianna Fáil
Cork East	John Moher	Fianna Fáil
Cork North	Batt Donegan	Fianna Fáil
Cork North	Patrick McAuliffe	Labour
Cork North	Denis O'Sullivan	Fine Gael
Cork South	Dan Desmond	Labour
Cork South	Seán McCarthy	Fianna Fáil
Cork South	Tadhg Manley	Fine Gael
Cork West	Edward Cotter	Fianna Fáil
Cork West	Michael Pat Murphy	Labour
Cork West	Florence Wycherley	Independent
Donegal East	Neil Blaney	Fianna Fáil
Donegal East	Liam Cunningham	Fianna Fáil
Donegal East	Daniel McMenamin	Fine Gael
Donegal East	William Sheldon	Independent
Donegal West	Joseph Brennan	Fianna Fáil
Donegal West	Cormac Breslin	Fianna Fáil
Donegal West	Patrick O'Donnell	Fine Gael
Dublin County	Kevin Boland	Fianna Fáil
Dublin County	Patrick Burke	Fianna Fáil
Dublin County	Éamon Rooney	Fine Gael
Dublin North-Central	Vivion de Valera	Fianna Fáil
Dublin North-Central	Colm Gallagher	Fianna Fáil
Dublin North-Central	Patrick McGilligan	Fine Gael
Dublin North-East	Jack Belton	Fine Gael
Dublin North-East	Patrick Byrne	Fine Gael
Dublin North-East	Charles Haughey	Fianna Fáil
Dublin North-East	Denis Larkin	Labour
Dublin North-East	Oscar Traynor	Fianna Fáil
Dublin North-West	Thomas Byrne	Independent
Dublin North-West	Declan Costello	Fine Gael
Dublin North-West	Richard Gogan	Fianna Fáil
Dublin South-Central	Philip Brady	Fianna Fáil
Dublin South-Central	Maurice E. Dockrell	Fine Gael
Dublin South-Central	Seán Lemass	Fianna Fáil
Dublin South-Central	Celia Lynch	Fianna Fáil
Dublin South-Central	Jack Murphy	Independent
Dublin South-East	Noël Browne	Independent
Dublin South-East	John A. Costello	Fine Gael
Dublin South-East	Seán MacEntee	Fianna Fáil
Dublin South-West	Robert Briscoe	Fianna Fáil
Dublin South-West	Bernard Butler	Fianna Fáil
Dublin South-West	James Carroll	Independent
Dublin South-West	Noel Lemass	Fianna Fáil
Dublin South-West	Michael O'Higgins	Fine Gael
Dún Laoghaire and Rathdown	Lionel Booth	Fianna Fáil
Dún Laoghaire and Rathdown	Seán Brady	Fianna Fáil
Dún Laoghaire and Rathdown	Liam Cosgrave	Fine Gael
Galway North	Michael Donnellan	Clann na Talmhan
Galway North	Mark Killilea Snr	Fianna Fáil
Galway North	Michael F. Kitt	Fianna Fáil
Galway South	Patrick Beegan	Fianna Fáil
Galway South	Michael Carty	Fianna Fáil
Galway South	Brigid Hogan	Fine Gael
Galway West	Gerald Bartley	Fianna Fáil
Galway West	Fintan Coogan	Fine Gael
Galway West	Johnny Geoghegan	Fianna Fáil
Kerry North	Patrick Finucane	Independent
Kerry North	Tom McEllistrim	Fianna Fáil
Kerry North	Daniel Moloney	Fianna Fáil
Kerry North	Dan Spring	Labour
Kerry South	Honor Crowley	Fianna Fáil
Kerry South	Patrick Palmer	Fine Gael
Kerry South	John Joe Rice	Sinn Féin
Kildare	Patrick Dooley	Fianna Fáil
Kildare	William Norton	Labour
Kildare	Gerard Sweetman	Fine Gael
Leix–Offaly	Kieran Egan	Fianna Fáil
Leix–Offaly	Nicholas Egan	Fianna Fáil
Leix–Offaly	Oliver J. Flanagan	Fine Gael
Leix–Offaly	Peadar Maher	Fianna Fáil
Leix–Offaly	Tom O'Higgins	Fine Gael
Limerick East	John Carew	Fine Gael
Limerick East	Paddy Clohessy	Fianna Fáil
Limerick East	Donogh O'Malley	Fianna Fáil
Limerick East	Ted Russell	Independent
Limerick West	James Collins	Fianna Fáil
Limerick West	Denis Jones	Fine Gael
Limerick West	Donnchadh Ó Briain	Fianna Fáil
Longford–Westmeath	Erskine H. Childers	Fianna Fáil
Longford–Westmeath	Charles Fagan	Fine Gael
Longford–Westmeath	Michael Kennedy	Fianna Fáil
Longford–Westmeath	Seán Mac Eoin	Fine Gael
Longford–Westmeath	Ruairí Ó Brádaigh	Sinn Féin
Louth	Frank Aiken	Fianna Fáil
Louth	George Coburn	Fine Gael
Louth	Pádraig Faulkner	Fianna Fáil
Mayo North	Phelim Calleary	Fianna Fáil
Mayo North	Seán Doherty	Fianna Fáil
Mayo North	Patrick Lindsay	Fine Gael
Mayo South	Joseph Blowick	Clann na Talmhan
Mayo South	Seán Flanagan	Fianna Fáil
Mayo South	Henry Kenny	Fine Gael
Mayo South	Mícheál Ó Móráin	Fianna Fáil
Meath	Patrick Giles	Fine Gael
Meath	James Griffin	Fianna Fáil
Meath	Michael Hilliard	Fianna Fáil
Monaghan	James Dillon	Fine Gael
Monaghan	Patrick Mooney	Fianna Fáil
Monaghan	Eighneachán Ó hAnnluain	Sinn Féin
Roscommon	John Beirne	Clann na Talmhan
Roscommon	James Burke	Fine Gael
Roscommon	Gerald Boland	Fianna Fáil
Roscommon	Jack McQuillan	Independent
Sligo–Leitrim	Stephen Flynn	Fianna Fáil
Sligo–Leitrim	Eugene Gilbride	Fianna Fáil
Sligo–Leitrim	John Joe McGirl	Sinn Féin
Sligo–Leitrim	Mary Reynolds	Fine Gael
Sligo–Leitrim	Patrick Rogers	Fine Gael
Tipperary North	John Fanning	Fianna Fáil
Tipperary North	Mary Ryan	Fianna Fáil
Tipperary North	Patrick Tierney	Labour
Tipperary South	Dan Breen	Fianna Fáil
Tipperary South	Michael Davern	Fianna Fáil
Tipperary South	Frank Loughman	Fianna Fáil
Tipperary South	Richard Mulcahy	Fine Gael
Waterford	William Kenneally	Fianna Fáil
Waterford	Thomas Kyne	Labour
Waterford	Thaddeus Lynch	Fine Gael
Waterford	John Ormonde	Fianna Fáil
Wexford	Denis Allen	Fianna Fáil
Wexford	Seán Browne	Fianna Fáil
Wexford	Brendan Corish	Labour
Wexford	Anthony Esmonde	Fine Gael
Wexford	James Ryan	Fianna Fáil
Wicklow	Paudge Brennan	Fianna Fáil
Wicklow	James Everett	Labour
Wicklow	James O'Toole	Fianna Fáil

== Changes ==
Date	Constituency	Loss	Gain	Note
20 March 1957	Clare	Labour	Ceann Comhairle	Patrick Hogan takes office as Ceann Comhairle
26 June 1957	Dublin North-Central	Fianna Fáil		Death of Colm Gallagher
14 November 1957	Dublin North-Central		Independent	Frank Sherwin wins seat vacated by the death of Gallagher
2 February 1958	Galway South	Fianna Fáil		Death of Patrick Beegan
16 May 1958	Dublin South-East	Independent	National Progressive Democrats	Noël Browne co-founds the National Progressive Democrats
16 May 1958	Roscommon	Independent	National Progressive Democrats	Jack McQuillan co-founds the National Progressive Democrats
30 May 1958	Galway South		Fianna Fáil	Anthony Millar holds seat vacated by the death of Beegan
13 May 1958	Dublin South-Central	Independent		Resignation of Jack Murphy
25 June 1958	Dublin South-Central		Fianna Fáil	Patrick Cummins wins seat vacated by the resignation of Murphy
13 March 1959	Dublin South-West	Fianna Fáil		Death of Bernard Butler
22 March 1959	Meath	Fianna Fáil		Death of James Griffin
17 June 1959	Clare	Fianna Fáil		Election of Éamon de Valera as president of Ireland
22 July 1959	Dublin South-West		Fine Gael	Richie Ryan wins seat vacated by the death of Butler
22 July 1959	Meath		Fianna Fáil	Henry Johnston holds seat vacated by the death of Griffin
22 July 1959	Clare		Fianna Fáil	Seán Ó Ceallaigh holds seat vacated by de Valera
20 January 1960	Carlow–Kilkenny	Fine Gael		Death of Joseph Hughes
23 June 1960	Carlow–Kilkenny		Fianna Fáil	Patrick Teehan wins seat vacated by the death of Hughes
24 November 1960	Sligo–Leitrim	Fianna Fáil		Death of Stephen Flynn
1 March 1961	Sligo–Leitrim		Fine Gael	Joseph McLoughlin wins seat vacated by the death of Flynn
29 March 1961	Wexford	Fianna Fáil		Death of Denis Allen
19 April 1961	Carlow–Kilkenny	Fianna Fáil		Death of Francis Humphreys
