= 1959 Meath by-election =

By-election to the 16th Dáil

- 22 July 1959
- Turnout: 25,621 (68.0%)
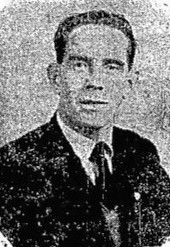
	Johnston		Farrelly
Nominee	Henry Johnston	James Tully	Denis Farrelly
Party	Fianna Fáil	Labour	Fine Gael
First preferences	11,063	6,918	5,751
Percentage	43.2%	27.0%	22.5%
Final count	12,475	10,926	–
TD before election
James Griffin
Fianna Fáil
TD after election
Henry Johnston
Fianna Fáil

A Dáil by-election was held in the constituency of Meath in Ireland on Wednesday, 22 July 1959, to fill a vacancy in the 16th Dáil. It followed the death of Fianna Fáil Teachta Dála (TD) James Griffin on 22 March 1959.

The writ of election to fill the vacancy was agreed by the Dáil on 30 June 1959.

The by-election was won by the Fianna Fáil candidate Henry Johnston.

Two other by-elections were held on the same day, in Clare and Dublin South-West.

Johnston lost his seat at the 1961 general election, and was never subsequently re-elected to the Dáil.

== Result ==
1959 Meath by-election
Party	Candidate	FPv%	Count		
Party	Candidate	FPv%	1	2	3
Fianna Fáil	Henry Johnston	43.2	11,063	11,338	12,475
Labour	James Tully	27.0	6,918	7,593	10,926
Fine Gael	Denis Farrelly	22.5	5,751	6,100	
Sinn Féin	Leo Collins	7.4	1,889		
Electorate: 37,686 Valid: 25,621 Quota: 12,811 Turnout: 68.0%
