= Cillian Ryan =

Academic economist

Cillian Ryan is an academic economist, professor emeritus and former pro vice-chancellor at Nottingham Trent University.

== Career ==
Ryan received his BA and MA in economics from University College Dublin and his Ph.D. from the University of Western Ontario. From 2016-2024 he was pro vice-chancellor at Nottingham Trent University, holding a variety of portfolios including of Head of College of Business, Law & Social Sciences, NTU Global and international recruitment, and community and elite sport. Prior to that appointment, he was pro vice-chancellor at De Montfort University, Leicester (2014–2016), and was the founding dean of liberal arts & sciences at the University of Birmingham (2011–2014). Other roles at the University of Birmingham included deputy head of the College of Social Sciences, (2008–2014), head of the European Research Institute (2005–2008), director of the university's Jean Monnet European Centre of Excellence (1998–2014), and holder of the Jean Monnet Chair in European Economics (1998–2014).

Ryan has advised the European Commission, UNCTAD, the WTO and many national governments on matters relating to trade in services, particularly financial services and financial service regulations, ranging from NAFTA in the 1980s to the present day. During the Conservative-Liberal coalition from 2010-2015 he was an advisor to the UK Cabinet Office on the UK Treasury and BIS EU Balance of Competencies Reviews. More recently he has provided advice on a range of post-Brexit trade agreement proposals relating to trade in education services.

He was the chair of the Leicestershire Police Ethics, Integrity and Complaints Committee (2015-2020), a member of the board of the Economics Network, an honorary professor at the University of Birmingham, and has served in a variety of capacities the Higher Education Academy, the European Jean Monnet Network, and the Royal Economics Society (including running the UK Royal Economics Society Easter School from 1992 to 2001).

== Research ==
His edited volumes include:

- "Financial Market Integration and Growth; Structural Change and Economic Dynamics in the European Union " P.J.J Welfens, Ryan, C, (eds). Springer-Verlag Heidelberg, 2011. ISBN 978-3-642-16273-2
- EU-ASEAN: Facing Economic Globalisation, P.J.J Welfens, Ryan, C, Chirathivat, S, and F Knipping (eds). Springer-Verlag Heidelberg, 2009, XVI, 246 p. 48 illus., ISBN 978-3-540-87388-4
- INTEGRATION IN ASIA AND EUROPE: Historical Dimensions, Comparative Analysis and Politico-Economic Dynamics, Chirathivat, S, Knipping, F, Ryan, C and P.J.J Welfens (eds). Springer-Verlag Heidelberg (2005).

== Awards ==
In 2008 he was the recipient of the EIIW European Economics Science Prize and was elected a Fellow of the Royal Society of the Arts in 2014.

== Personal life ==
Ryan was educated at Synge Street CBS and is the son of the former Irish Minister of Finance, Richie Ryan.
