= 1958 Dublin South-Central by-election =

By-election to the 16th Dáil

- 25 June 1958
- Turnout: 17,583 (34.1%)
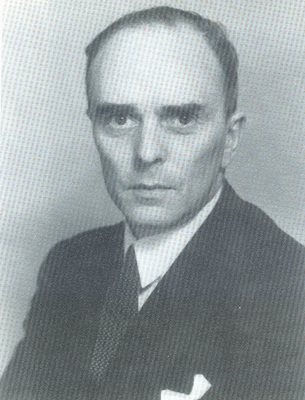
	Cummins	Hegarty
Nominee	Patrick Cummins	John Hegarty	Seán MacBride
Party	Fianna Fáil	Fine Gael	Clann na Poblachta
First preferences	6,014	3,089	3,030
Percentage	34.2%	17.6%	17.2%
Final count	7,988	–	7,083
TD before election
Jack Murphy
Independent
TD after election
Patrick Cummins
Fianna Fáil

A Dáil by-election was held in the constituency of Dublin South-Central in Ireland on Wednesday, 25 June 1958, to fill a vacancy in the 16th Dáil. It followed the resignation of independent Teachta Dála (TD) Jack Murphy on 13 May 1958.

The writ of election to fill the vacancy was agreed by the Dáil on 4 June 1958.

The by-election was won by the Fianna Fáil candidate Patrick Cummins.

== Result ==
1958 Dublin South-Central by-election
Party	Candidate	FPv%	Count			
Party	Candidate	FPv%	1	2	3	4
Fianna Fáil	Patrick Cummins	34.2	6,014	6,337	7,111	7,988
Fine Gael	John Hegarty	17.6	3,089	3,619	4,386	
Clann na Poblachta	Seán MacBride	17.2	3,030	3,799	4,925	7,083
Labour	Frank Cluskey	15.7	2,762	3,352		
National Progressive Democrats	Noel Hartnett	15.3	2,688			
Electorate: 51,567 Valid: 17,583 Quota: 8,792 Turnout: 34.1%
