= 1961 Sligo–Leitrim by-election =

By-election to the 16th Dáil

- 1 March 1961
- Turnout: 32,933 (58.1%)
| | McLoughlin | Farrell |
| Nominee | Joseph McLoughlin | Willie Farrell |
| Party | Fine Gael | Fianna Fáil |
| First preferences | 17,126 | 15,807 |
| Percentage | 52.0% | 48.0% |
TD before election
Stephen Flynn
Fianna Fáil
TD after election
Joseph McLoughlin
Fine Gael

A Dáil by-election was held in the constituency of Sligo–Leitrim in Ireland on Wednesday, 1 March 1961, to fill a vacancy in the 16th Dáil. It followed the death of Fianna Fáil Teachta Dála (TD) Stephen Flynn on 24 November 1960.

The writ of election to fill the vacancy was agreed by the Dáil on 8 February 1961.

The by-election was won by the Fine Gael candidate Joseph McLoughlin.

== Result ==
1961 Sligo–Leitrim by-election
| Party | Candidate | FPv% | Count |
| Party | Candidate | FPv% | 1 |
|---|---|---|---|
| Fine Gael | Joseph McLoughlin | 52.0 | 17,126 |
| Fianna Fáil | Willie Farrell | 48.0 | 15,807 |
Electorate: 56,714 Valid: 32,933 Quota: 16,467 Turnout: 58.1%
