= 1959 Clare by-election =

By-election to the 16th Dáil

- 22 July 1959
- Turnout: 32,388 (68.6%)
	Ó Ceallaigh	Gordon	Sabhat
Nominee	Seán Ó Ceallaigh	Francis Gordon	Séamus Sabhat
Party	Fianna Fáil	Fine Gael	Sinn Féin
First preferences	18,154	8,770	5,464
Percentage	56.1%	27.1%	16.9%
TD before election
Éamon de Valera
Fianna Fáil
TD after election
Seán Ó Ceallaigh
Fianna Fáil

A Dáil by-election was held in the constituency of Clare in Ireland on Wednesday, 22 July 1959, to fill a vacancy in the 16th Dáil. It followed the election of the Taoiseach Éamon de Valera (Note: Éamon de Valera was elected as a Fianna Fáil TD at the 1957 general election.) as president of Ireland on 17 June 1959.

Under Article 12.6.2° of the Constitution of Ireland, a member of either House of the Oireachtas who is elected as president is deemed to have vacated that seat.

The writ of election to fill the vacancy was agreed by the Dáil on 30 June 1959.

The by-election was won by the Fianna Fáil candidate Seán Ó Ceallaigh.

Two other by-elections were held on the same day, in Dublin South-West and Meath.

== Result ==
1959 Clare by-electione
Party	Candidate	FPv%	Count
Party	Candidate	FPv%	1
Fianna Fáil	Seán Ó Ceallaigh	56.1	18,154
Fine Gael	Francis Gordon	27.1	8,770
Sinn Féin	Séamus Sabhat	16.9	5,464
Electorate: 47,227 Valid: 32,388 Quota: 16,195 Turnout: 68.6%
