= 1959 Dublin South-West by-election =

By-election to the 16th Dáil

- 22 July 1959
- Turnout: 24,975 (40.0%)
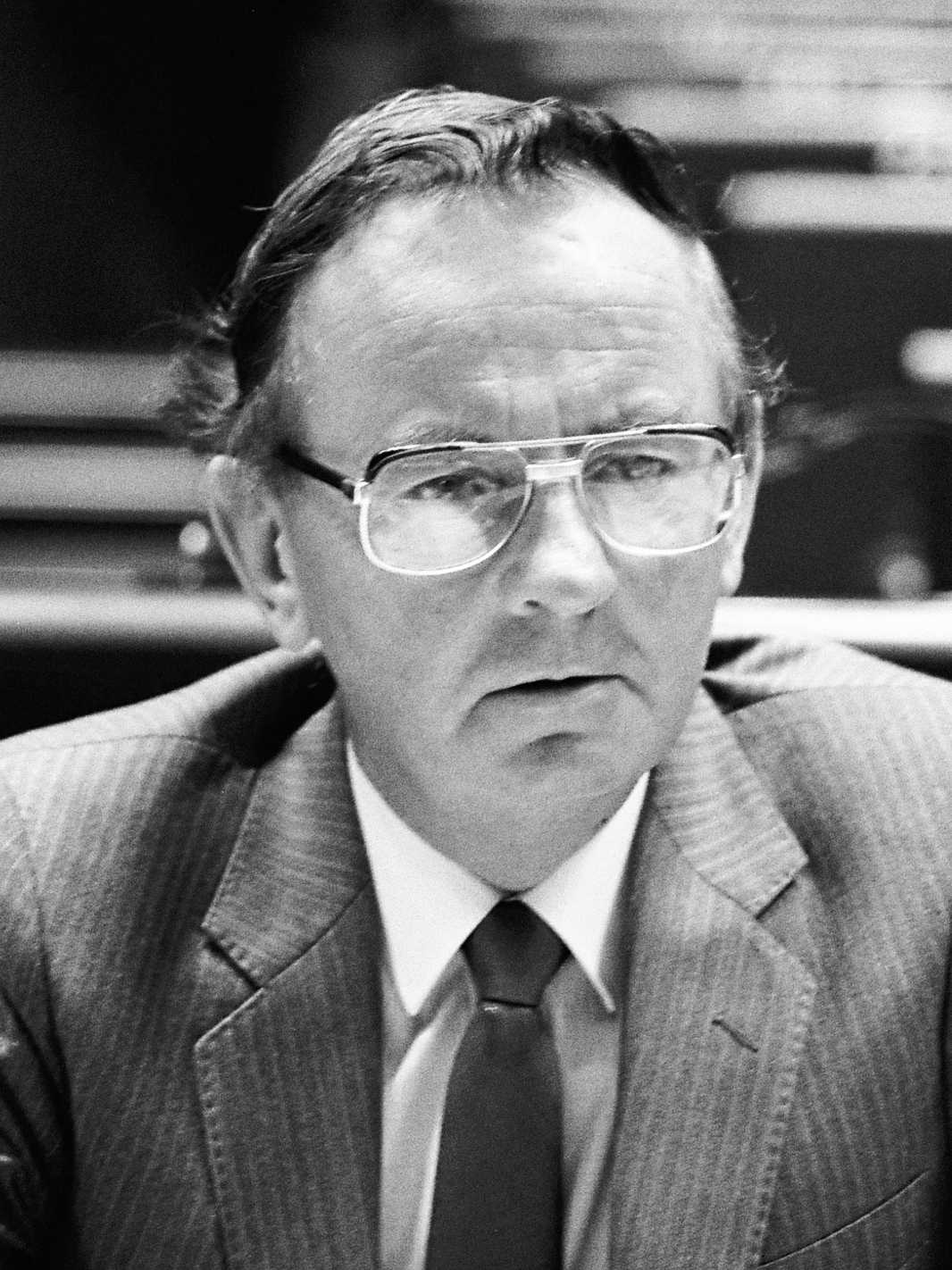

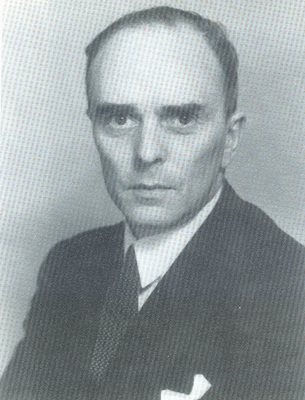
		Dowling
Nominee	Richie Ryan	Joseph Dowling	Seán MacBride
Party	Fine Gael	Fianna Fáil	Clann na Poblachta
First preferences	6,523	9,280	5,138
Percentage	26.1%	37.2%	20.6%
Final count	11,399	11,343	–
TD before election
Bernard Butler
Fianna Fáil
TD after election
Richie Ryan
Fine Gael

A Dáil by-election was held in the constituency of Dublin South-West in Ireland on Wednesday, 22 July 1959, to fill a vacancy in the 16th Dáil. It followed the death of Fianna Fáil Teachta Dála (TD) Bernard Butler on 13 March 1959.

The writ of election to fill the vacancy was agreed by the Dáil on 30 June 1959.

The by-election was won by the Fine Gael candidate Richie Ryan, by a margin of 56 votes.

Two other by-elections were held on the same day, in Clare and Meath.

== Result ==
1959 Dublin South-West by-election
Party	Candidate	FPv%	Count			
Party	Candidate	FPv%	1	2	3	4
Fianna Fáil	Joseph Dowling	37.2	9,280	9,449	9,888	11,343
Fine Gael	Richie Ryan	26.1	6,523	6,638	7,396	11,399
Clann na Poblachta	Seán MacBride	20.6	5,138	5,709	7,035	
Labour	Hilda Larkin	10.8	2,693	2,883		
Sinn Féin	Tomás Ó Dubhghaill	5.4	1,341			
Electorate: 62,394 Valid: 24,975 Quota: 12,488 Turnout: 40.0%
