= Stephen Flynn (Irish politician) =

Irish politician (died 1960)

Teachta Dála
- In office February 1948 – 24 November 1960
- Constituency: Sligo–Leitrim
- In office July 1937 – February 1948
- Constituency: Leitrim
- In office February 1932 – July 1937
- Constituency: Leitrim–Sligo

Personal details
- Died: 24 November 1960
- Party: Fianna Fáil

Stephen Flynn (died 24 November 1960) was an Irish Fianna Fáil politician. He was first elected to Dáil Éireann as a Fianna Fáil Teachta Dála (TD) at the 1932 general election for the Leitrim–Sligo constituency.

He was re-elected at each subsequent general election up to 1957. He died in 1960 during the 16th Dáil, a by-election was held on 1 March 1961 which was won by Joseph McLoughlin of Fine Gael.

Flynn was the longest serving chairperson of Leitrim County Council.

Dáil	Election	Deputy (Party)	Deputy (Party)	Deputy (Party)
9th	1937	Stephen Flynn (FF)	Bernard Maguire (FF)	Mary Reynolds (FG)
10th	1938	Stephen Flynn (FF)	Bernard Maguire (FF)	Mary Reynolds (FG)
11th	1943	Stephen Flynn (FF)	Bernard Maguire (Ind.)	Mary Reynolds (FG)
12th	1944	Stephen Flynn (FF)	Bernard Maguire (Ind.)	Mary Reynolds (FG)
13th	1948	Constituency abolished. See Sligo–Leitrim		

Dáil	Election	Deputy (Party)	Deputy (Party)	Deputy (Party)	Deputy (Party)	Deputy (Party)
13th	1948	Eugene Gilbride (FF)	Stephen Flynn (FF)	Bernard Maguire (Ind.)	Mary Reynolds (FG)	Joseph Roddy (FG)
14th	1951	Eugene Gilbride (FF)	Stephen Flynn (FF)	Patrick Rogers (FG)	Mary Reynolds (FG)	Joseph Roddy (FG)
15th	1954	Eugene Gilbride (FF)	Stephen Flynn (FF)	Bernard Maguire (Ind.)	Mary Reynolds (FG)	Joseph Roddy (FG)
16th	1957	Eugene Gilbride (FF)	Stephen Flynn (FF)	John Joe McGirl (SF)	Mary Reynolds (FG)	Patrick Rogers (FG)
16th	1961 by-election	Eugene Gilbride (FF)	Joseph McLoughlin (FG)	John Joe McGirl (SF)	Mary Reynolds (FG)	Patrick Rogers (FG)
17th	1961	Eugene Gilbride (FF)	Joseph McLoughlin (FG)	James Gallagher (FF)	Eugene Gilhawley (FG)	4 seats 1961–1969
18th	1965	Eugene Gilbride (FF)	Joseph McLoughlin (FG)	James Gallagher (FF)	Eugene Gilhawley (FG)	4 seats 1961–1969
19th	1969	Ray MacSharry (FF)	Joseph McLoughlin (FG)	James Gallagher (FF)	3 seats 1969–1981	
20th	1973	Ray MacSharry (FF)	Joseph McLoughlin (FG)	Eugene Gilhawley (FG)	3 seats 1969–1981	
21st	1977	Ray MacSharry (FF)	James Gallagher (FF)	Eugene Gilhawley (FG)	3 seats 1969–1981	
22nd	1981	Ray MacSharry (FF)	John Ellis (FF)	Joe McCartin (FG)	Ted Nealon (FG)	4 seats 1981–2007
23rd	1982 (Feb)	Ray MacSharry (FF)	John Ellis (FF)	Matt Brennan (FF)	Ted Nealon (FG)	4 seats 1981–2007
24th	1982 (Nov)	Ray MacSharry (FF)	Joe McCartin (FG)	Matt Brennan (FF)	Ted Nealon (FG)	4 seats 1981–2007
25th	1987	Ray MacSharry (FF)	John Ellis (FF)	Matt Brennan (FF)	Ted Nealon (FG)	4 seats 1981–2007
26th	1989	Gerry Reynolds (FG)	John Ellis (FF)	Matt Brennan (FF)	Ted Nealon (FG)	4 seats 1981–2007
27th	1992	Declan Bree (Lab)	John Ellis (FF)	Matt Brennan (FF)	Ted Nealon (FG)	4 seats 1981–2007
28th	1997	Gerry Reynolds (FG)	John Ellis (FF)	Matt Brennan (FF)	John Perry (FG)	4 seats 1981–2007
29th	2002	Marian Harkin (Ind.)	John Ellis (FF)	Jimmy Devins (FF)	John Perry (FG)	4 seats 1981–2007
30th	2007	Constituency abolished. See Sligo–North Leitrim and Roscommon–South Leitrim				

Dáil	Election	Deputy (Party)	Deputy (Party)	Deputy (Party)	Deputy (Party)
32nd	2016	Martin Kenny (SF)	Marc MacSharry (FF)	Eamon Scanlon (FF)	Tony McLoughlin (FG)
33rd	2020	Martin Kenny (SF)	Marc MacSharry (FF)	Marian Harkin (Ind.)	Frank Feighan (FG)
34th	2024	Martin Kenny (SF)	Eamon Scanlon (FF)	Marian Harkin (Ind.)	Frank Feighan (FG)

Dáil	Election	Deputy (Party)	Deputy (Party)	Deputy (Party)	Deputy (Party)	Deputy (Party)	Deputy (Party)	Deputy (Party)
4th	1923	Martin McGowan (Rep)	Frank Carty (Rep)	Thomas Carter (CnaG)	Seán Farrell (Rep)	James Dolan (CnaG)	John Hennigan (CnaG)	Alexander McCabe (CnaG)
4th	1925 by-election	Martin McGowan (Rep)	Frank Carty (Rep)	Samuel Holt (Rep)	Seán Farrell (Rep)	James Dolan (CnaG)	John Hennigan (CnaG)	Martin Roddy (CnaG)
5th	1927 (Jun)	John Jinks (NL)	Frank Carty (FF)	Samuel Holt (FF)	Michael Carter (FP)	James Dolan (CnaG)	John Hennigan (CnaG)	Martin Roddy (CnaG)
6th	1927 (Sep)	Bernard Maguire (FF)	Frank Carty (FF)	Samuel Holt (FF)	Patrick Reynolds (CnaG)	James Dolan (CnaG)	John Hennigan (CnaG)	Martin Roddy (CnaG)
6th	1929 by-election	Bernard Maguire (FF)	Frank Carty (FF)	Seán Mac Eoin (CnaG)	Patrick Reynolds (CnaG)	James Dolan (CnaG)	John Hennigan (CnaG)	Martin Roddy (CnaG)
7th	1932	Bernard Maguire (FF)	Frank Carty (FF)	Stephen Flynn (FF)	Mary Reynolds (CnaG)	William Browne (FF)	John Hennigan (CnaG)	Martin Roddy (CnaG)
8th	1933	Bernard Maguire (FF)	Frank Carty (FF)	Stephen Flynn (FF)	Patrick Rogers (NCP)	William Browne (FF)	James Dolan (CnaG)	Martin Roddy (CnaG)
9th	1937	Constituency abolished. See Sligo and Leitrim						
