= Jack Murphy (Irish politician) =

Irish politician (1920–1984)

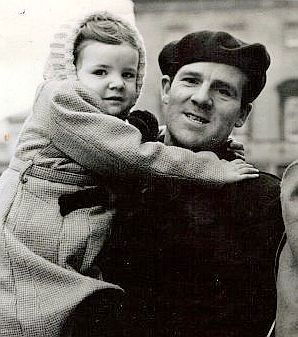
- Murphy in late 1950s

Teachta Dála
- In office March 1957 – 13 May 1958
- Constituency: Dublin South-Central

Personal details
- Born: John Murphy; 1920 Dublin, Ireland
- Died: 11 July 1984 (aged 63–64) Dublin, Ireland
- Spouse: Maureen Murphy
- Children: 5
- Education: St Mary's National School, Rathmines; Bolton Street Technical College
- Occupation: Politician, Carpenter
- Known for: Independent politician, republican, and the first unemployed person ever elected to a national legislature.

John Murphy (1920 – 11 July 1984) was an Irish politician and the first unemployed person ever elected to a national legislature. He was elected to Dáil Éireann as an independent Teachta Dála (TD) at the 1957 general election for Dublin South-Central.

Murphy had been interned in the 1940s as a member of the Irish Republican Army. At the time of his election, he was an unemployed carpenter. He was the candidate of the Unemployed Protest Committee (UPC), which had been formed on 12 January 1957. He resigned his seat on 13 May 1958 in protest at the indifference of the main political parties to the plight of the unemployed. After his resignation he subsequently emigrated with his family to Canada but returned to Ireland in 1964. He died on 11 July 1984.

== Early years ==
Murphy was born in 1920 at the back of Synge Street, Dublin. He was the second youngest son of a carpenter and had five brothers and five sisters. His father, a well-known athlete who won the all-Ireland walking championship in 1903, was active in the republican movement and was a founder-member of the National Union of Woodworkers. Murphy joined Fianna Éireann at the age of 10. Up to the age of 14 he attended St Mary's National School, Rathmines, and then started work as an apprentice carpenter, while attending Bolton Street Technical College, now Dublin Institute of Technology in the evenings. He became a member of the Irish Republican Army at 16. He was also an active trade union member from an early age as demonstrated when, as a carpenters apprentice, he became one of the leaders of a strike on the River Liffey Reservoir Scheme (popularly known as the Poulaphouca Scheme). The strike lasted several months until only three of the original committee remained, with Murphy being one of them.

Arrested in 1941 by the Fianna Fáil government, he was interned with a number of other republicans in the Curragh until the end of The Emergency in 1945. These four years afforded him time to study, broadening his interest and outlook. A fluent Irish speaker, he was interviewed in Irish for his entry into the National College of Art and Design after his release from the Curragh. In the Mansion House Exhibition of 1950 he won an arts and crafts certificate for his leather and craftwork.

He returned to his trade of carpentry where he was quickly re-elected shop steward after he took a leading part in several actions and strikes for better conditions, most notably the strike to end the campaign of sackings by employers which took place in 1953. However, in 1956, during which record unemployed figures were reached in Ireland, he found himself one of the many thousands out of work.

He emigrated to England, but returned after four months as he missed his family. He later said: "I am against emigration for many reasons, one is that it wrecks family life. When I worked in England I nearly broke my heart thinking of my wife and youngsters all the time I was there. Here in Ireland the clergy and politicians are always preaching about the sanctity of the Christian family, but they do nothing about the unemployment and emigration that is breaking up thousands of families."

== Protest committee ==
Murphy came to the conclusion that the only way to fight unemployment was to do it in Ireland with an organised movement. As he saw it, with national emigration running at 40–50,000 per year, "Irish capital is being exported abroad and the Irish working class are being exported with it."

On 12 January 1957 with 11 other Dublin men they formed the Unemployed Protest Committee (UPC) for the purpose of protesting against the unemployment situation, and Murphy was named as secretary. While some articles and papers written after the event later imply that the UPC had been a political organisation, Murphy himself never intended the UPC to be either a political organisation or political party. He explained: "The UPC was not a political organisation as such. It was intended to spotlight the problem of unemployment and emigration. That was my intention when I went to the Dáil".

To focus the eyes of the nation on the plight of the unemployed the committee organised a series of well-attended orderly marches through Dublin streets of a colourful yet serious nature. The marches were usually preceded by a home made-coffin; "We organised marches through the city. We hoped to arouse the conscience of the Nation. We carried a black coffin, symbolising our only hope if we did not fight.". However, despite their pageantry the UPC marches seem to have had limited impact on the employment situation and on the policy makers.

== 1957 general election ==
The fall of the government on 4 February 1957, due to the withdrawal of support by Seán MacBride's Clann na Poblachta, led to the 1957 general election and provided an opportunity for the UPC to dramatically escalate their protests. Seeing the need to put employment on to the political agenda the UPC decided to run a candidate. Murphy said at the time: "We thought of all types of schemes to approach the politicians, we would ask them to make a statement from their election platforms on their policy to solve unemployment. But again we knew that they would easily agree to such a suggestion during the election campaign, just as easily as they would forget the unemployed after they were elected. No, the only way to make these people understand that we were a force to be reckoned with was to contest a seat in the election."

Two names were put forward as possible candidates at a meeting in Parnell Square: Sam Nolan, and Jack Murphy. After much consideration it was decided that Murphy would be more suitable. When some Committee members suggested that Nolan might be the better choice, Peadar O'Donnell argued that, with a background as a leading member of the Communist party, his candidacy might frighten voters away. Nolan himself pointed out that his Communist credentials would have a negative impact as anti-communist sentiment was rife following the Soviet invasion of Hungary of 1956.

It was decided that Murphy, with his republican background, would run in Dublin South-Central, firstly because this inner city constituency had a high population density which would be more convenient to canvass compared than a large sprawling area, and secondly it housed the largest Labour Exchange in Dublin City, Werburgh Street. This location offered a platform for the UPC to get their message across. They distributed leaflets outside Werburgh Street while across the River Liffey on Dublin's North side, they broadcast election messages from a UPC office at the Dublin Trades' Union Council in Gardiner Street, with hired and borrowed loadspeakers, to men signing on at the nearby Gardiner Street Labour Exchange.

The task of raising the £100 deposit necessary to stand as a candidate was taken on by Peader O'Donnell. He received £25 each from four friends including Fr. Counihane, a Jesuit priest who sympathised with the cause of Labour;, Digby, the owner of Pye Radio; a Fianna Fáil politician called Murry; and Toddy O'Sullivan, manager of the Gresham Hotel. It has been said of Dublin City that "a good cause will always find support in an unexpected way"; the campaign was run on a shoestring budget. Murphy said of their financial situation, "We had no funds. With bobs and pennies sacrificed from doles and unemployment money we fought on".

Following an appeal for volunteers, the UPC reported significant participation from unemployed supporters. During the campaign, volunteers canvassed over 14,000 houses and produced campaign posters featuring the slogan Writing. The campaign attracted public attention, and letters of support and subscriptions were received at the Protest office in Derby Square, Dublin. Elizabeth Faye assisted the campaign by typing correspondence.

With his trademark black beret and straight-talking approach, Murphy proved a popular candidate. He emerged victorious with 3,036 votes thus becoming the first unemployed man ever elected to a national legislature. His seat was gained at the expense of the Labour Party who had fielded Roddy Connolly (son of James Connolly) as their candidate, though many Labour activists in the area campaigned for Murphy.

== 16th Dáil ==
While many of his unemployed supporters considered the fact that Murphy had been elected as victory in itself, neither they nor Murphy had anticipated the task he faced inside the Dáil. His maiden speech was greeted by sneers and sniggers from the professional politicians in the Dáil and set the scene for what was to follow. The suspicion and disdain with which Murphy was regarded with by established parliamentary members meant that initially he could not get answers to even to the most basic of his queries – such as how much unemployment relief money was to be spent in Dublin.

Despite this, over his term, Murphy stubbornly persisted and used every opportunity to ignite serious consideration within the Dáil on questions surrounding poverty, emigration and unemployment assistance. He also used his vote in protest to remind the established parties of their pre-election promises; as exemplified by his statement on 20 March 1957 in opposition to the election of the Fianna Fáil leader Éamon de Valera as Taoiseach:

I do not propose to support the nomination of Deputy de Valera as Taoiseach, despite the fact that Deputy de Valera has publicly stated that his first task will be to solve unemployment. I have heard these promises before and my presence here is a symbol of broken promises and should be taken as a warning that emigration and unemployment will no longer be suffered in silence. This election proves that the people have given Fianna Fáil the task of solving unemployment. I realise that that problem will not be solved in a few weeks and that any Government should be given an opportunity of putting its programme into effect. I will support fully any scheme which will reduce unemployment and emigration. I hope my simple statement will be met with understanding, both inside and outside the House.

Murphy did not limit his role to criticism. He also made suggestions for new projects which could create jobs

"In view of the fact that there is still widespread unemployment in the building industry, would the Taoiseach consider taking more drastic measures to bring about a revival of house building? In Dublin City, we have no concert hall, no proper Houses of Parliament and we need more modern municipal buildings. The country needs these things very badly and they would give much-needed employment to building workers. I speak, Sir, with a sense of urgency which springs from looking at unfortunate men trying to survive in present conditions."

On occasion he also attempted to force votes on issues he was concerned with, such as the motion for increasing assistance to the unemployed on 25 March 1958:

"I wish to state that I am appalled at the callous indifference of the Parliamentary Secretary... The statement that there is no money to give these unfortunate people a further increase will be regarded by decent Christian people as a downright lie. I am still convinced that, with any kind of honest effort, the lot of the poorer sections of our people could be improved. The unemployed and the old age pensioners will continue to press for elementary Christian justice. I have asked, and I now repeat my request, for a free vote of the House on this issue."

Other members of the house attacked the UPC, such as Fine Gael's Stephen Barrett, who on 12 June 1957 declared the UPC (and therefore Murphy himself) part of "a new communist assault" on Ireland.

As a result, Murphy made little headway in the political process within the Dáil. In the end he admitted in despair that "I found that Leinster House was more a centre of political activity and useless talk than a place where plans could be made to ease the lot of the unfortunate".

== Hunger strike ==
Murphy's troubles were greatly multiplied once the new Fianna Fáil government's budget was revealed to be a particularly severe one, and including planning for the ending of food subsidies which was going to hit his support base of the unemployed and low paid workers particularly hard. Murphy later said: "In my time in the Dáil and even before that, I was in many of their [the unemployed] homes. I saw hunger and misery, ill-nourished children and despairing parents. That is still continuing. I knew when the 'famine budget' of 1957 was brought in that their position would be worsened."

Murphy opposed the impending budget within the Dáil. In his statement of 15 May 1957 he contrasted the budget sharply with the unfilled pre-election promises of Fianna Fáil: "On behalf of my unemployed colleagues, I want to make it quite clear that we are opposed completely to this Budget, firstly, because it does nothing to relieve unemployment and there is no indication of any plans by the Government to bring about increased employment. In fact, this Budget will worsen the unemployment position by reducing the purchasing power of the people. Secondly, we are opposed to it because it inflicts a greater hardship on the suffering unemployed, old age pensioners, widows and the lower income groups. The demands of the unemployed are quite simple and realistic: that the Government should immediately take what measures it intends taking to alleviate unemployment. We do not want merely words and paper proposals; we want action based on concrete proposals."

However given the majority that Fianna Fáil enjoyed within the government, Murphy realised that even if he could force a vote on the budget he would inevitably lose and so further debate on the issue would serve little purpose but to waste time.

He next tried to put pressure on the government to scale back the proposed cuts via "people power", stating "the unemployed are a force to be reckoned with. Flesh and blood, not just something the statistician jumbles around with.", he began mobilising supporters to stage a series of high-profile street demonstrations. To escalate things further, along with two other members of the UPC (Tommy Kavanagh and Jimmy Byrne) Murphy began a hunger strike in opposition to the budget. Each evening they addressed thousands of supporters who assembled at protest meetings in Dublin at the corner of Abbey Street and O'Connell Street.

The hunger strikers initially garnered much support from trade unions. Against this background a series of one day industrial strikes and actions against the government became a real possibility. However, on the fourth day of the protest, after winning the small concession from the Government with the announcement that it would reintroduce controls on the price of bread, it was decided to end the hunger strike. The ending of the hunger strike meant organised industrial strike action was no longer considered possible.

== Resignation ==
Realising he could not stand against the proposed budget on his own in the Dáil and that the demonstrations on the streets were not having the desired political impact, Murphy then tried another approach by contacting established society figures in an effort to garner support to lobby against the cuts.

Unfortunately he made the mistake of attempting to enlist the aid of the powerful and conservative Catholic Archbishop of Dublin John Charles McQuaid. McQuaid eventually did meet with Murphy alone but instead of providing any assistance to the embattled TD he began to put pressure on Murphy to break with the UPC on the basis that communists were using him via the committee. McQuaid's official response to his meeting with Murphy was that he could not interfere in political decisions – an announcement which flew in the face of his actions the previous year when he publicly dictated to the previous Government over the ill-fated Mother and Child Scheme. Shortly afterwards McQuaid formally denounced the unemployment movement – a move which at a single stroke ended the possibility of Murphy enlisting any support from other church figures or from any other high-profile individuals.

In addition to such major public reversals, Murphy also faced with a growing dissatisfaction at the lack of political progress coming from supporters. Moreover, he was by now being forced to defend against pressure coming from within the ranks of the UPC itself for him to take a more left-leaning agenda.

Murphy himself had been adamant since the beginning that the UPC had been formed solely to spotlight the issues of emigration and unemployment in Ireland and therefore was never intended to be "a political entity as such" – but its surprise election success had attracted many new supporters, not all of whom shared his views. Once Murphy had been elected to Leinster House, he became largely removed from the day-to-day operations of the committee. Without his stewardship the UPC itself had become increasingly dominated by other individuals who saw the UPC not as he did, as a vehicle solely dedicated to highlighting emigration/unemployment issues, but rather as a potentially viable platform for wider agendas and sweeping political change in Ireland. Their repeated attempts to influence Murphy to promote their agenda – and his steadfast refusal to do the same – meant that the UPC meetings became characterised by growing friction, with clashes between the highly charged-political committee and the increasingly marginalised Murphy becoming more common.

Under severe strain and personal attack from all sides Murphy thus began to disassociate himself from UPC activities. In August 1957 he formally broke with the committee. Ultimately, less than a year later, on Tuesday 13 May 1958 he yielded to the mounting pressure and resigned his seat in protest at the indifference of the main political parties to the plight of the unemployed. The subsequent by-election was won by Patrick Cummins of Fianna Fáil.

Of his resignation Murphy later stated: "I was fed up with the callous indifference of the big parties to the situation of the workers. I resigned as a protest against appalling indifference of those parties to the unemployed... When Mr de Valera was nominated for Taoiseach, I opposed him because he had broken his promise on unemployment and emigration. I told the house that my presence there was a symbol of broken promises. I said that I would support any scheme to put an end to mass unemployment and emigration. But in my 15 months in the Dáil, no-one put forward such a scheme."

== Emigration to Canada ==
Immediately following his resignation as a TD, Murphy, now once again unemployed, discovered to his dismay that as a result of his cards not being stamped during his time in office he was no longer eligible for full assistance and was reduced to living on the meagre sum of £2 1 shilling per week for his entire family. Faced with this situation he reluctantly made the decision to emigrate to Canada in 1959. He stated "Since Christmas I have been unable to get any work, apart from a couple of weeks. The building trade is finished. But there is plenty of work if only the Government would put up the money for it instead of putting millions into the purchase of jet planes. Irish tradesmen have emigrated in thousands. And they will continue to go. There is no hope for them here. Many people will say that I am quitting, pulling out in failure. But mostly they will be people with good, solid jobs. IF I SAW THE SLIGHTEST HOPE, I WOULD STAY. I REPEAT THAT. But it broke my heart to see my wife trying to get along on a few shillings a week."

== Canada ==
Following his resignation, Murphy emigrated to Saskatchewan, Canada, where his sister Molly and her husband Micheal Durnin lived. Once he arrived he set about seeking employment but carpentry work in Saskatchewan at that time was hard to get. In January 1960 he was visited by another Dublin man from Francis St named Joe Johnston who at the time was in the Canadian Armed Forces, Signal Corps. Johnston had just been posted to Regina after a large winter army exercise near Alberta, he heard about an Irish family who were living in Regina and tracked them down. He says "The first time I met Jack, I was shocked to find him and his family living in a small 1 bedroom shack without heating buried under huge snow drifts. It was bitterly cold and their situation was grim. It turns out that while Jack had managed to get some work as a carpenter with a company called "Sash And Door" during the Spring, he had been laid off in the winter due to the seasonal nature of Canadian construction (which of course he hadn't been aware of before his arrival)". Johnston noted wryly at the time that despite Murphy's emigration to Canada "It seemed things were going from bad to worse for Jack, and he was just as unemployed in Regina as he had been in Dublin".

However, despite these initial difficulties, Murphy eventually did find part-time work in carpentry. His woodworking skills were ably demonstrated by a detailed carving he did for a Sergeant Stankey of the Canadian Army NCO's mess which he was introduced to by Johnston. Thanks to this and other jobs he did for members of the same establishment, Murphy was eventually voted in as an associate member. Johnston recalled later "Being an associate member of the NCO's mess was a much sought-after honour in that region. It was quite funny to me at the time, although not to some others who voted against us, that Jack (who was after all a convicted republican) was invited to be an associate member of an army mess. For his part, Jack made some notable contributions – some beautiful carvings – including one particular one I remember which had a maple leaf and shamrock intertwined which was proudly put by Stankey behind the bar on display".

"It's true Jack had a colourful past, but the great thing about Canada was that at that time they didn't hold sins committed in the "old world" against you. In the final analysis I think the most people there recognised right away that regardless of his political background Jack was an honest man, with an excellent work ethic and a real craftsman who held his own work and that of others to very high standards. In fact once word got out about his experience and skills, he became very much sought after by the staff and regulars alike because of his first rate advice on any building project or maintenance of houses. And of course he was a terrific speaker and debater, and unlike many he was good company no matter on which side of the political debate you stood. So despite the stiff initial opposition to him from some quarters, eventually everyone came around and he became very popular."

Murphy made a number of other friends while in Regina including Al Thompson, who was from a very old famous building company family, and was married into the Lavery family who had very strong attachments to Ireland. He was also a friend of Arthur Lavery who later returned to Ireland and became a solicitor. After a number of years, due to homesickness, Murphy returned with his family to Ireland as the economic situation in his native country had improved and there was more opportunities for work than existed in 1959 when emigration was at its peak.

== Return to Ireland ==
Murphy returned to Ireland with his family in 1964. He lived for a short spell in Dublin's York Street before moving out to the suburbs of Coolock, on the north side of Dublin City. He continued working as a carpenter on various building sites around Dublin. His last place of employment was at Cadbury's in Coolock. He worked there until 1982 when he took ill. He died on 11 July 1984, aged 64 years.

== Accusations ==
In the wake of his resignation and emigration to Canada, Murphy became a convenient scape-goat and was pilloried by established politicians, rivals and even certain former supporters. Indeed for the remainder of his life he endured an unrelentingly hostile and negative campaign from many quarters which attempted to put an unfavourable "spin" on both his intentions and his actions as a TD. He later responded to several of the chief accusations laid against him in the article "Why I left Ireland" as told to Jim Flanagan which was published in The Sunday Review on 29 March 1959.

One accusation is he used his influence as a TD to cheat the system and assist supporters. However Murphy himself stated emphatically to Jim Flanagan in this article how he was careful to avoid abusing his influence as a TD. For example, he refused to get jobs for people, as other TDs both before and after him did as a matter of course, rather electing to help people via existing support structures: "I did what I could, for they were all my friends... [but] there was far too much place hunting, [however] as far as I could I helped those who were in trouble, mainly through the labour exchange."

Another allegation of note which was circulated against Murphy after his emigration to Canada was that over the fifteen months he worked as a TD he had secretly hoarded large amounts of money from his monthly salary at the expense of his supporters and then "ran off to Canada with a fortune". This accusation is evidently disproved by even the most cursory examination of Murphy's later status and circumstance. Immediately following his resignation he was once again unemployed and in a move contrary to his own avowed principles and stated desires he was forced to emigrate due to a combination of a lack of funds and being blacklisted by employers for being too political. His subsequent dire initial situation in Canada, his continued lack of money upon his return to Ireland, and the telling fact that he worked for the remainder of his life in factories and building sites as a carpenter until his premature death all clearly demonstrate daily financial struggle. Moreover, during his time in office, articles of the period saluted Murphy for distributing the majority of his salary in donations to families in distress and old persons in dire poverty – with he himself drawing from his parliamentary pay no more than the equivalent salary of a qualified carpenter.

Other charges later laid against Murphy take the form of more direct ad hominem attacks. There were several examples of these, most notably those catalogued in "The Communist Party of Ireland, A Critical History, Part 3" which bewails Murphy's "political inexperience" along with implied egotism behind the assertion that he resigned and emigrated because he could "neither act as Dáil mouthpiece for or national leader of the movement". This article attributes an egotism to Murphy which is notably absent in any other recorded sources. Indeed, independent articles of the day (that is written and published by neither the UPC nor its associates) refer to Murphy as "quite free from personal vanity or presumption" and speak of his "honesty, integrity and sincerity". In addition on no occasion did Murphy ever seek, or claim, "leadership" of the unemployed or any other movement – on the contrary it is very noticeable that in both his own published writings and in his speeches to the Dáil he very seldom refers to himself at all (preferring to talk in terms of "we, the unemployed") but whenever he does speak of himself in first person, he referred to himself as merely a "representative" of the unemployed.

A final accusation made against Murphy in absentia after his emigration was that he resigned and left Ireland because he was not up to the task of solving the emigration and unemployment issues or that he reneged on promises to do the same. In fact Murphy himself explicitly stated at the time of his election that he never intended to solve the unemployment crises. Instead he specifically says that his sole purpose in the Dáil is to allow the unemployed voice their concern and put pressure on the political parties in government to make good on election promises to address these critical issues: "We shall continue to focus the plight of the unemployed in Dáil Éireann by our representation, who was not put there to solve this scourge of unemployment, but to put added pressure on the political parties who have it in their power to bring about some measure of relief to the unemployed and to ensure the future of the employed."

Murphy's repeated his efforts to bring these same urgent national issues to debate in the Dáil during his term. The numerous recorded speeches he made during his term in office show his integrity, sincerity and the commitment he had to fulfilling his promise to highlighting the plight of the unemployed – a commitment which ultimately exacted a heavy toll on both his own health and his family.

"I tried hard all along and no one can say that I did not try to spot-light the problems and evils of our country."

Dáil	Election	Deputy (Party)	Deputy (Party)	Deputy (Party)	Deputy (Party)	Deputy (Party)
13th	1948	Seán Lemass (FF)	James Larkin Jnr (Lab)	Con Lehane (CnaP)	Maurice E. Dockrell (FG)	John McCann (FF)
14th	1951	Seán Lemass (FF)	James Larkin Jnr (Lab)	Philip Brady (FF)	Maurice E. Dockrell (FG)	John McCann (FF)
15th	1954	Seán Lemass (FF)	James Larkin Jnr (Lab)	Thomas Finlay (FG)	Maurice E. Dockrell (FG)	Celia Lynch (FF)
16th	1957	Seán Lemass (FF)	Jack Murphy (Ind.)	Philip Brady (FF)	Maurice E. Dockrell (FG)	Celia Lynch (FF)
16th	1958 by-election	Seán Lemass (FF)	Patrick Cummins (FF)	Philip Brady (FF)	Maurice E. Dockrell (FG)	Celia Lynch (FF)
17th	1961	Seán Lemass (FF)	Patrick Cummins (FF)	Philip Brady (FF)	Maurice E. Dockrell (FG)	Joseph Barron (CnaP)
18th	1965	Seán Lemass (FF)	Frank Cluskey (Lab)	Philip Brady (FF)	Maurice E. Dockrell (FG)	Thomas J. Fitzpatrick (FF)
19th	1969	Richie Ryan (FG)	Ben Briscoe (FF)	Philip Brady (FF)	John O'Donovan (Lab)	4 seats 1969–1977
20th	1973	Richie Ryan (FG)	Ben Briscoe (FF)	Philip Brady (FF)	John Kelly (FG)	4 seats 1969–1977
21st	1977	Fergus O'Brien (FG)	Frank Cluskey (Lab)	Thomas J. Fitzpatrick (FF)	3 seats 1977–1981	
22nd	1981	Fergus O'Brien (FG)	Ben Briscoe (FF)	Thomas J. Fitzpatrick (FF)	Gay Mitchell (FG)	John O'Connell (Note: O'Connell served as Ceann Comhairle in the 22nd and 23rd Dáil from 1981 to 1983 and was returned automatically at the February 1982 and November 1982 general elections. He joined Fianna Fáil in January 1985.) (Ind.)
23rd	1982 (Feb)	Frank Cluskey (Lab)	Ben Briscoe (FF)	Thomas J. Fitzpatrick (FF)	Gay Mitchell (FG)	John O'Connell (Ind.)
24th	1982 (Nov)	Frank Cluskey (Lab)	Ben Briscoe (FF)	Fergus O'Brien (FG)	Gay Mitchell (FG)	John O'Connell (Ind.)
25th	1987	Frank Cluskey (Lab)	Ben Briscoe (FF)	Fergus O'Brien (FG)	Gay Mitchell (FG)	Mary Mooney (FF)
26th	1989	John O'Connell (FF)	Ben Briscoe (FF)	Fergus O'Brien (FG)	Gay Mitchell (FG)	Eric Byrne (WP)
27th	1992	John O'Connell (FF)	Ben Briscoe (FF)	Pat Upton (Lab)	Gay Mitchell (FG)	4 seats 1992–2002
27th	1994 by-election	Eric Byrne (DL)	Ben Briscoe (FF)	Pat Upton (Lab)	Gay Mitchell (FG)	4 seats 1992–2002
28th	1997	Seán Ardagh (FF)	Ben Briscoe (FF)	Pat Upton (Lab)	Gay Mitchell (FG)	4 seats 1992–2002
28th	1999 by-election	Seán Ardagh (FF)	Ben Briscoe (FF)	Mary Upton (Lab)	Gay Mitchell (FG)	4 seats 1992–2002
29th	2002	Seán Ardagh (FF)	Aengus Ó Snodaigh (SF)	Mary Upton (Lab)	Gay Mitchell (FG)	Michael Mulcahy (FF)
30th	2007	Seán Ardagh (FF)	Aengus Ó Snodaigh (SF)	Mary Upton (Lab)	Catherine Byrne (FG)	Michael Mulcahy (FF)
31st	2011	Eric Byrne (Lab)	Aengus Ó Snodaigh (SF)	Joan Collins (PBP)	Catherine Byrne (FG)	Michael Conaghan (Lab)
32nd	2016	Bríd Smith (AAA–PBP)	Aengus Ó Snodaigh (SF)	Joan Collins (Note: Founded Right to Change in May 2020.) (I4C)	Catherine Byrne (FG)	4 seats from 2016
33rd	2020	Bríd Smith (S–PBP)	Aengus Ó Snodaigh (SF)	Joan Collins (I4C)	Patrick Costello (GP)	4 seats from 2016
34th	2024	Catherine Ardagh (FF)	Aengus Ó Snodaigh (SF)	Máire Devine (SF)	Jen Cummins (SD)	4 seats from 2016
