= Patrick Cummins (politician) =

Irish politician (1921–2009)

Teachta Dála
- In office June 1958 – April 1965
- Constituency: Dublin South-Central

Personal details
- Born: 10 June 1921 Dublin, Ireland
- Died: 5 March 2009 (aged 87) Dublin, Ireland
- Party: Fianna Fáil

Patrick J. Cummins (10 June 1921 – 5 March 2009) was an Irish Fianna Fáil politician.

He was the son of Paddy Cummins who was a baker from Pearse Street, Dublin and a sergeant in the 6th Royal Dublin Fusiliers during World War I.

He was elected to Dáil Éireann as a Fianna Fáil Teachta Dála (TD) for the Dublin South-Central constituency at the 1958 by-election caused by the resignation of the independent TD Jack Murphy. He was re-elected at the 1961 general election but lost his seat at the 1965 general election, and was an unsuccessful candidate at the 1969 and 1973 general elections.

He was a Dublin City Councillor and a governor of the Royal Irish Academy of Music. He was a member of the Royal Dublin Fusiliers Association, his father's regiment.

| Dáil | Election | Deputy (Party) | Deputy (Party) | Deputy (Party) | Deputy (Party) | Deputy (Party) |
|---|---|---|---|---|---|---|
| 13th | 1948 | Seán Lemass (FF) | James Larkin Jnr (Lab) | Con Lehane (CnaP) | Maurice E. Dockrell (FG) | John McCann (FF) |
| 14th | 1951 | Seán Lemass (FF) | James Larkin Jnr (Lab) | Philip Brady (FF) | Maurice E. Dockrell (FG) | John McCann (FF) |
| 15th | 1954 | Seán Lemass (FF) | James Larkin Jnr (Lab) | Thomas Finlay (FG) | Maurice E. Dockrell (FG) | Celia Lynch (FF) |
| 16th | 1957 | Seán Lemass (FF) | Jack Murphy (Ind.) | Philip Brady (FF) | Maurice E. Dockrell (FG) | Celia Lynch (FF) |
| 16th | 1958 by-election | Seán Lemass (FF) | Patrick Cummins (FF) | Philip Brady (FF) | Maurice E. Dockrell (FG) | Celia Lynch (FF) |
| 17th | 1961 | Seán Lemass (FF) | Patrick Cummins (FF) | Philip Brady (FF) | Maurice E. Dockrell (FG) | Joseph Barron (CnaP) |
| 18th | 1965 | Seán Lemass (FF) | Frank Cluskey (Lab) | Philip Brady (FF) | Maurice E. Dockrell (FG) | Thomas J. Fitzpatrick (FF) |
| 19th | 1969 | Richie Ryan (FG) | Ben Briscoe (FF) | Philip Brady (FF) | John O'Donovan (Lab) | 4 seats 1969–1977 |
| 20th | 1973 | Richie Ryan (FG) | Ben Briscoe (FF) | Philip Brady (FF) | John Kelly (FG) | 4 seats 1969–1977 |
| 21st | 1977 | Fergus O'Brien (FG) | Frank Cluskey (Lab) | Thomas J. Fitzpatrick (FF) | 3 seats 1977–1981 | |
| 22nd | 1981 | Fergus O'Brien (FG) | Ben Briscoe (FF) | Thomas J. Fitzpatrick (FF) | Gay Mitchell (FG) | John O'Connell (Note: O'Connell served as Ceann Comhairle in the 22nd and 23rd Dáil from 1981 to 1983 and was returned automatically at the February 1982 and November 1982 general elections. He joined Fianna Fáil in January 1985.) (Ind.) |
| 23rd | 1982 (Feb) | Frank Cluskey (Lab) | Ben Briscoe (FF) | Thomas J. Fitzpatrick (FF) | Gay Mitchell (FG) | John O'Connell (Ind.) |
| 24th | 1982 (Nov) | Frank Cluskey (Lab) | Ben Briscoe (FF) | Fergus O'Brien (FG) | Gay Mitchell (FG) | John O'Connell (Ind.) |
| 25th | 1987 | Frank Cluskey (Lab) | Ben Briscoe (FF) | Fergus O'Brien (FG) | Gay Mitchell (FG) | Mary Mooney (FF) |
| 26th | 1989 | John O'Connell (FF) | Ben Briscoe (FF) | Fergus O'Brien (FG) | Gay Mitchell (FG) | Eric Byrne (WP) |
| 27th | 1992 | John O'Connell (FF) | Ben Briscoe (FF) | Pat Upton (Lab) | Gay Mitchell (FG) | 4 seats 1992–2002 |
| 27th | 1994 by-election | Eric Byrne (DL) | Ben Briscoe (FF) | Pat Upton (Lab) | Gay Mitchell (FG) | 4 seats 1992–2002 |
| 28th | 1997 | Seán Ardagh (FF) | Ben Briscoe (FF) | Pat Upton (Lab) | Gay Mitchell (FG) | 4 seats 1992–2002 |
| 28th | 1999 by-election | Seán Ardagh (FF) | Ben Briscoe (FF) | Mary Upton (Lab) | Gay Mitchell (FG) | 4 seats 1992–2002 |
| 29th | 2002 | Seán Ardagh (FF) | Aengus Ó Snodaigh (SF) | Mary Upton (Lab) | Gay Mitchell (FG) | Michael Mulcahy (FF) |
| 30th | 2007 | Seán Ardagh (FF) | Aengus Ó Snodaigh (SF) | Mary Upton (Lab) | Catherine Byrne (FG) | Michael Mulcahy (FF) |
| 31st | 2011 | Eric Byrne (Lab) | Aengus Ó Snodaigh (SF) | Joan Collins (PBP) | Catherine Byrne (FG) | Michael Conaghan (Lab) |
| 32nd | 2016 | Bríd Smith (AAA–PBP) | Aengus Ó Snodaigh (SF) | Joan Collins (Note: Founded Right to Change in May 2020.) (I4C) | Catherine Byrne (FG) | 4 seats from 2016 |
| 33rd | 2020 | Bríd Smith (S–PBP) | Aengus Ó Snodaigh (SF) | Joan Collins (I4C) | Patrick Costello (GP) | 4 seats from 2016 |
| 34th | 2024 | Catherine Ardagh (FF) | Aengus Ó Snodaigh (SF) | Máire Devine (SF) | Jen Cummins (SD) | 4 seats from 2016 |
