= Henry Johnston (Irish politician) =

Irish politician (1908–1977)

Teachta Dála
- In office July 1959 – October 1961
- Constituency: Meath

Personal details
- Born: 11 November 1908 County Meath, Ireland
- Died: 9 January 1977 (aged 68) County Meath, Ireland
- Party: Fianna Fáil

Henry Martin Johnston (11 November 1908 – 9 January 1977) was an Irish Fianna Fáil politician. A farmer by trade, he was elected to Dáil Éireann as a Fianna Fáil Teachta Dála (TD) for the Meath constituency at the 1959 by-election caused by the death of James Griffin of Fianna Fáil. He lost his seat at the 1961 general election.

Dáil	Election	Deputy (Party)	Deputy (Party)	Deputy (Party)
4th	1923	Patrick Mulvany (FP)	David Hall (Lab)	Eamonn Duggan (CnaG)
5th	1927 (Jun)	Matthew O'Reilly (FF)	David Hall (Lab)	Eamonn Duggan (CnaG)
6th	1927 (Sep)	Matthew O'Reilly (FF)	Arthur Matthews (CnaG)	Eamonn Duggan (CnaG)
7th	1932	James Kelly (FF)	Arthur Matthews (CnaG)	Eamonn Duggan (CnaG)
8th	1933	James Kelly (FF)	Robert Davitt (CnaG)	Matthew O'Reilly (FF)
9th	1937	Constituency abolished. See Meath–Westmeath		

Dáil	Election	Deputy (Party)	Deputy (Party)	Deputy (Party)	Deputy (Party)	Deputy (Party)
13th	1948	Matthew O'Reilly (FF)	Michael Hilliard (FF)	3 seats until 1977	Patrick Giles (FG)	3 seats until 1977
14th	1951	Matthew O'Reilly (FF)	Michael Hilliard (FF)	3 seats until 1977	Patrick Giles (FG)	3 seats until 1977
15th	1954	James Tully (Lab)	Michael Hilliard (FF)	3 seats until 1977	Patrick Giles (FG)	3 seats until 1977
16th	1957	James Griffin (FF)	Michael Hilliard (FF)	3 seats until 1977	Patrick Giles (FG)	3 seats until 1977
16th	1959 by-election	Henry Johnston (FF)	Michael Hilliard (FF)	3 seats until 1977	Patrick Giles (FG)	3 seats until 1977
17th	1961	James Tully (Lab)	Michael Hilliard (FF)	3 seats until 1977	Denis Farrelly (FG)	3 seats until 1977
18th	1965	James Tully (Lab)	Michael Hilliard (FF)	3 seats until 1977	Denis Farrelly (FG)	3 seats until 1977
19th	1969	James Tully (Lab)	Michael Hilliard (FF)	3 seats until 1977	John Bruton (FG)	3 seats until 1977
20th	1973	James Tully (Lab)	Brendan Crinion (FF)	3 seats until 1977	John Bruton (FG)	3 seats until 1977
21st	1977	James Tully (Lab)	Brendan Crinion (FF)	Jim Fitzsimons (FF)	John Bruton (FG)	4 seats 1977–1981
22nd	1981	James Tully (Lab)	Brendan Crinion (FF)	Jim Fitzsimons (FF)	John Bruton (FG)	John V. Farrelly (FG)
23rd	1982 (Feb)	Michael Lynch (FF)	Colm Hilliard (FF)	Jim Fitzsimons (FF)	John Bruton (FG)	John V. Farrelly (FG)
24th	1982 (Nov)	Frank McLoughlin (Lab)	Colm Hilliard (FF)	Jim Fitzsimons (FF)	John Bruton (FG)	John V. Farrelly (FG)
25th	1987	Michael Lynch (FF)	Colm Hilliard (FF)	Noel Dempsey (FF)	John Bruton (FG)	John V. Farrelly (FG)
26th	1989	Mary Wallace (FF)	Colm Hilliard (FF)	Noel Dempsey (FF)	John Bruton (FG)	John V. Farrelly (FG)
27th	1992	Mary Wallace (FF)	Colm Hilliard (FF)	Noel Dempsey (FF)	John Bruton (FG)	Brian Fitzgerald (Lab)
28th	1997	Mary Wallace (FF)	Johnny Brady (FF)	Noel Dempsey (FF)	John Bruton (FG)	John V. Farrelly (FG)
29th	2002	Mary Wallace (FF)	Johnny Brady (FF)	Noel Dempsey (FF)	John Bruton (FG)	Damien English (FG)
29th	2005 by-election	Mary Wallace (FF)	Johnny Brady (FF)	Noel Dempsey (FF)	Shane McEntee (FG)	Damien English (FG)
30th	2007	Constituency abolished. See Meath East and Meath West				
