= Joseph McLoughlin =

Irish politician (1916–1991)

Teachta Dála
- In office March 1961 – June 1977
- Constituency: Sligo–Leitrim

Personal details
- Born: 12 August 1916 County Sligo, Ireland
- Died: 3 July 1991 (aged 74) County Sligo, Ireland
- Party: Fine Gael
- Relatives: Tony McLoughlin (nephew)

Joseph McLoughlin (12 August 1916 – 3 July 1991) was an Irish Fine Gael politician. A farmer before entering politics, he was first elected to Dáil Éireann as a Fine Gael Teachta Dála (TD) for the Sligo–Leitrim constituency at the 1961 by-election following the death of the Fianna Fáil TD Stephen Flynn. He was re-elected at each subsequent general election until he lost his seat at the 1977 general election.

His nephew Tony McLoughlin was a Fine Gael TD for Sligo–North Leitrim from 2011 to 2020.

== See also ==
- Families in the Oireachtas

Dáil	Election	Deputy (Party)	Deputy (Party)	Deputy (Party)	Deputy (Party)	Deputy (Party)
13th	1948	Eugene Gilbride (FF)	Stephen Flynn (FF)	Bernard Maguire (Ind.)	Mary Reynolds (FG)	Joseph Roddy (FG)
14th	1951	Eugene Gilbride (FF)	Stephen Flynn (FF)	Patrick Rogers (FG)	Mary Reynolds (FG)	Joseph Roddy (FG)
15th	1954	Eugene Gilbride (FF)	Stephen Flynn (FF)	Bernard Maguire (Ind.)	Mary Reynolds (FG)	Joseph Roddy (FG)
16th	1957	Eugene Gilbride (FF)	Stephen Flynn (FF)	John Joe McGirl (SF)	Mary Reynolds (FG)	Patrick Rogers (FG)
16th	1961 by-election	Eugene Gilbride (FF)	Joseph McLoughlin (FG)	John Joe McGirl (SF)	Mary Reynolds (FG)	Patrick Rogers (FG)
17th	1961	Eugene Gilbride (FF)	Joseph McLoughlin (FG)	James Gallagher (FF)	Eugene Gilhawley (FG)	4 seats 1961–1969
18th	1965	Eugene Gilbride (FF)	Joseph McLoughlin (FG)	James Gallagher (FF)	Eugene Gilhawley (FG)	4 seats 1961–1969
19th	1969	Ray MacSharry (FF)	Joseph McLoughlin (FG)	James Gallagher (FF)	3 seats 1969–1981	
20th	1973	Ray MacSharry (FF)	Joseph McLoughlin (FG)	Eugene Gilhawley (FG)	3 seats 1969–1981	
21st	1977	Ray MacSharry (FF)	James Gallagher (FF)	Eugene Gilhawley (FG)	3 seats 1969–1981	
22nd	1981	Ray MacSharry (FF)	John Ellis (FF)	Joe McCartin (FG)	Ted Nealon (FG)	4 seats 1981–2007
23rd	1982 (Feb)	Ray MacSharry (FF)	John Ellis (FF)	Matt Brennan (FF)	Ted Nealon (FG)	4 seats 1981–2007
24th	1982 (Nov)	Ray MacSharry (FF)	Joe McCartin (FG)	Matt Brennan (FF)	Ted Nealon (FG)	4 seats 1981–2007
25th	1987	Ray MacSharry (FF)	John Ellis (FF)	Matt Brennan (FF)	Ted Nealon (FG)	4 seats 1981–2007
26th	1989	Gerry Reynolds (FG)	John Ellis (FF)	Matt Brennan (FF)	Ted Nealon (FG)	4 seats 1981–2007
27th	1992	Declan Bree (Lab)	John Ellis (FF)	Matt Brennan (FF)	Ted Nealon (FG)	4 seats 1981–2007
28th	1997	Gerry Reynolds (FG)	John Ellis (FF)	Matt Brennan (FF)	John Perry (FG)	4 seats 1981–2007
29th	2002	Marian Harkin (Ind.)	John Ellis (FF)	Jimmy Devins (FF)	John Perry (FG)	4 seats 1981–2007
30th	2007	Constituency abolished. See Sligo–North Leitrim and Roscommon–South Leitrim				

Dáil	Election	Deputy (Party)	Deputy (Party)	Deputy (Party)	Deputy (Party)
32nd	2016	Martin Kenny (SF)	Marc MacSharry (FF)	Eamon Scanlon (FF)	Tony McLoughlin (FG)
33rd	2020	Martin Kenny (SF)	Marc MacSharry (FF)	Marian Harkin (Ind.)	Frank Feighan (FG)
34th	2024	Martin Kenny (SF)	Eamon Scanlon (FF)	Marian Harkin (Ind.)	Frank Feighan (FG)
