= Electoral (Amendment) (Dáil Constituencies) Act 2013 =

Constituencies in use at Dáil elections from 2016 to 2020

Oireachtas
- Long title: AN ACT TO PROVIDE FOR THE NUMBER OF MEMBERS OF DÁIL ÉIREANN, FOR THE REVISION OF CONSTITUENCIES AND FOR THE NUMBER OF MEMBERS TO BE ELECTED FOR SUCH CONSTITUENCIES AND TO PROVIDE FOR RELATED MATTERS.
- Citation: No. 7 of 2013
- Signed: 20 March 2013
- Commenced: 3 February 2016
- Repealed: 14 January 2020

Legislative history
- Bill citation: No. 84 of 2012
- Introduced by: Minister for the Environment, Community and Local Government (Phil Hogan)
- Introduced: 3 October 2012

Amends
- Electoral (Amendment) Act 2009

Repealed by
- Electoral (Amendment) (Dáil Constituencies) Act 2017
- Status: Repealed

The Electoral (Amendment) (Dáil Constituencies) Act 2013 (No. 7) is a law of Ireland which revised Dáil constituencies in light of the 2011 census and a requirement to reduce the number of Dáil seats. The new constituencies took effect on the dissolution of the 31st Dáil on 3 February 2016 and a general election for the 32nd Dáil on the revised constituencies took place on 26 February 2016.

The membership of the Dáil had stood at 166 TDs since the 1981 general election. An amendment to electoral law in 2011 set the range of membership at between 153 and 160 TDs. In July 2011, the Minister for the Environment, Community and Local Government established an independent Constituency Commission under the terms of the Electoral Act 1997. The commission was chaired by John Cooke, judge of the High Court, and delivered its report in June 2012.

The Act implemented the recommendations of this report, replacing the Dáil constituencies defined in the Electoral (Amendment) Act 2009, which had been in effect since the 2011 general election. The size of the Dáil was reduced to 158 TDs, a reduction of 8, arranged in 40 constituencies, with district magnitude ranging from 3 to 5.

This act was repealed by the Electoral (Amendment) (Dáil Constituencies) Act 2017, which took effect on the dissolution of the 32nd Dáil and was used at the 2020 general election, held on 8 February.

== Constituencies for the 32nd Dáil ==
Dáil constituencies at the 2016 general election

| Constituency | Created | Seats |
|---|---|---|
| Carlow–Kilkenny | 1948 | 5 |
| Cavan–Monaghan | 1977 | 4 |
| Clare | 1921 | 4 |
| Cork East | 1981 | 4 |
| Cork North-Central | 1981 | 4 |
| Cork North-West | 1981 | 3 |
| Cork South-Central | 1981 | 4 |
| Cork South-West | 1961 | 3 |
| Donegal | 2016 | 5 |
| Dublin Bay North | 2016 | 5 |
| Dublin Bay South | 2016 | 4 |
| Dublin Central | 1981 | 3 |
| Dublin Fingal | 2016 | 5 |
| Dublin Mid-West | 2002 | 4 |
| Dublin North-West | 1981 | 3 |
| Dublin Rathdown | 2016 | 3 |
| Dublin South-Central | 1948 | 4 |
| Dublin South-West | 1981 | 5 |
| Dublin West | 1981 | 4 |
| Dún Laoghaire | 1977 | 4 |
| Galway East | 1977 | 3 |
| Galway West | 1937 | 5 |
| Kerry | 2016 | 5 |
| Kildare North | 1997 | 4 |
| Kildare South | 1997 | 3 |
| Laois | 2016 | 3 |
| Limerick City | 2011 | 4 |
| Limerick County | 2016 | 3 |
| Longford–Westmeath | 2007 | 4 |
| Louth | 1923 | 5 |
| Mayo | 1997 | 4 |
| Meath East | 2007 | 3 |
| Meath West | 2007 | 3 |
| Offaly | 2016 | 3 |
| Roscommon–Galway | 2016 | 3 |
| Sligo–Leitrim | 2016 | 4 |
| Tipperary | 2016 | 5 |
| Waterford | 1923 | 4 |
| Wexford | 1921 | 5 |
| Wicklow | 1923 | 5 |

== Overview of changes ==
=== Change in seats ===
This table, summarises the changes in representation. It does not address revisions to the boundaries of constituencies.

| Constituency | Seats 2011 | Seats 2016 |
|---|---|---|
| Cavan–Monaghan | 5 | 4 |
| Cork South-Central | 5 | 4 |
| Dublin Central | 4 | 3 |
| Dublin South-Central | 5 | 4 |
| Dublin South-West | 4 | 5 |
| Galway East | 4 | 3 |
| Mayo | 5 | 4 |

=== Constituencies abolished ===
| Constituency | Seats | Area now in |
|---|---|---|
| Donegal North-East | 3 | Donegal |
| Donegal South-West | 3 | Donegal and Sligo–Leitrim |
| Dublin North | 4 | Dublin Fingal |
| Dublin North-Central | 3 | Dublin Bay North |
| Dublin North-East | 3 | Dublin Bay North |
| Dublin South | 5 | Dublin Rathdown, Dublin South-West and Dún Laoghaire |
| Dublin South-East | 4 | Dublin Bay South |
| Kerry North–West Limerick | 3 | Kerry and Limerick County |
| Kerry South | 3 | Kerry |
| Laois–Offaly | 5 | Laois and Offaly |
| Limerick | 3 | Limerick County |
| Roscommon–South Leitrim | 3 | Roscommon–Galway and Sligo–Leitrim |
| Sligo–North Leitrim | 3 | Sligo–Leitrim |
| Tipperary North | 3 | Tipperary and Offaly |
| Tipperary South | 3 | Tipperary |

=== New constituencies ===
| Constituency | Seats | Area from |
|---|---|---|
| Donegal | 5 | Donegal North-East and Donegal South-West |
| Dublin Bay North | 5 | Dublin North-Central and Dublin North-East |
| Dublin Bay South | 4 | Dublin South-Central and Dublin South-East |
| Dublin Fingal | 5 | Dublin North and Dublin West |
| Dublin Rathdown | 3 | Dublin South |
| Kerry | 5 | Kerry North–West Limerick and Kerry South |
| Laois | 3 | Laois–Offaly |
| Limerick County | 3 | Limerick and Kerry North–West Limerick |
| Offaly | 3 | Laois–Offaly and Tipperary North |
| Roscommon–Galway | 3 | Galway East and Roscommon–South Leitrim |
| Sligo–Leitrim | 4 | Cavan–Monaghan, Donegal South-West, Roscommon–South Leitrim and Sligo–North Leitrim |
| Tipperary | 5 | Tipperary North and Tipperary South |
