= Gilbride =

Gilbride is a surname. Notable people with the surname include:

- Eugene Gilbride (1892–1972), Irish farmer and politician
- Kevin Gilbride (born 1951), American football coach
- Kevin M. Gilbride (born 1979), American football coach, son of Kevin
