= Electoral (Amendment) (Dáil Constituencies) Act 2017 =

Constituencies in use at Dáil elections from 2020 to present

Oireachtas
- Long title: An Act to provide for the number of members of Dáil Éireann; for the revision of constituencies and for the number of members to be elected for such constituencies; to amend the Electoral Act 1997; and to provide for matters connected therewith.
- Citation: No. 39 of 2017
- Signed: 23 December 2017
- Commenced: 23 December 2017 & 14 January 2020
- Repealed: 8 November 2024

Legislative history
- Bill citation: No. 137 of 2017
- Introduced by: Minister for Housing, Planning and Local Government (Eoghan Murphy)
- Introduced: 20 November 2017

Repeals
- Electoral (Amendment) (Dáil Constituencies) Act 2013

Repealed by
- Electoral (Amendment) Act 2023
- Status: Repealed

The Electoral (Amendment) (Dáil Constituencies) Act 2017 (No. 39) is a law of Ireland which revised Dáil constituencies. It took effect on the dissolution of the 32nd Dáil on 14 January 2020 and a general election for the 33rd Dáil on the revised constituencies took place on 8 February 2020.

Following the 2016 census, the Minister for the Environment, Community and Local Government established an independent Constituency Commission under terms of the Electoral Act 1997. The commission was chaired by Robert Haughton, judge of the High Court, and delivered its report in June 2017. It proposed several changes to Dáil constituencies, increasing the number of seats in the Dáil from 158 to 160, while the number of constituencies were reduced by 1 to 39.

The Act implemented the recommendations of this report and repealed the Electoral (Amendment) (Dáil Constituencies) Act 2013, which had defined the constituencies used since the 2016 general election. It increased the range for future revisions by the Constituency Commission of Dáil constituencies from between 153 and 160 TDs in 2011 legislation, to between 166 and 172 TDs.

This act was repealed by the Electoral (Amendment) Act 2023, which took effect on the dissolution of the 33rd Dáil on 8 November 2024, and created a new schedule of constituencies in use at the 2024 general election.

== Revised constituencies ==
Dáil constituencies at the 2020 general election

Constituency	Created	Seats
Carlow–Kilkenny	1948	5
Cavan–Monaghan	1977	5
Clare	1921	4
Cork East	1981	4
Cork North-Central	1981	4
Cork North-West	1981	3
Cork South-Central	1981	4
Cork South-West	1961	3
Donegal	2016	5
Dublin Bay North	2016	5
Dublin Bay South	2016	4
Dublin Central	1981	4
Dublin Fingal	2016	5
Dublin Mid-West	2002	4
Dublin North-West	1981	3
Dublin Rathdown	2016	3
Dublin South-Central	1948	4
Dublin South-West	1981	5
Dublin West	1981	4
Dún Laoghaire	1977	4
Galway East	1977	3
Galway West	1937	5
Kerry	2016	5
Kildare North	1997	4
Kildare South	1997	4
Laois–Offaly	2020	5
Limerick City	2011	4
Limerick County	2016	3
Longford–Westmeath	2007	4
Louth	1923	5
Mayo	1997	4
Meath East	2007	3
Meath West	2007	3
Roscommon–Galway	2016	3
Sligo–Leitrim	2016	4
Tipperary	2016	5
Waterford	1923	4
Wexford	1921	5
Wicklow	1923	5

=== Change in seats ===
This table summarises the changes in representation but does not address revisions to the boundaries of constituencies.

Constituency	Seats 2016	Seats 2020
Cavan–Monaghan	4	5
Dublin Central	3	4
Kildare South	3	4

=== Constituencies abolished ===
Constituency	Seats	Area now in
Laois	3	Laois–Offaly and Tipperary
Offaly	3	Laois–Offaly and Kildare South

=== New constituencies ===
Constituency	Seats	Area from
Laois–Offaly	5	Laois and Offaly
