= 2014 Roscommon–South Leitrim by-election =

By-election to the 31st Dáil

- 10 October 2014
- Turnout: 33,572 (51.8%)
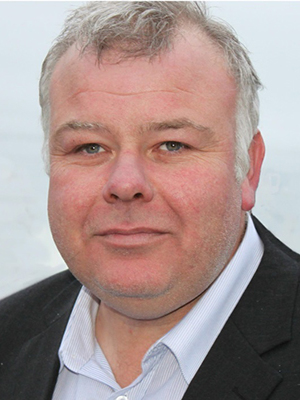

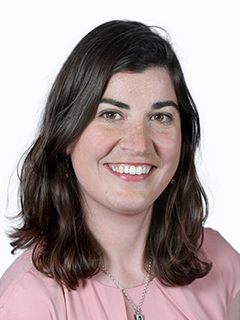
		Connaughton
Nominee	Michael Fitzmaurice	Ivan Connaughton	Maura Hopkins
Party	Independent	Fianna Fáil	Fine Gael
First preferences	6,220	7,334	5,593
Percentage	18.7%	22.0%	16.8%
Final count	14,881	12,050	–
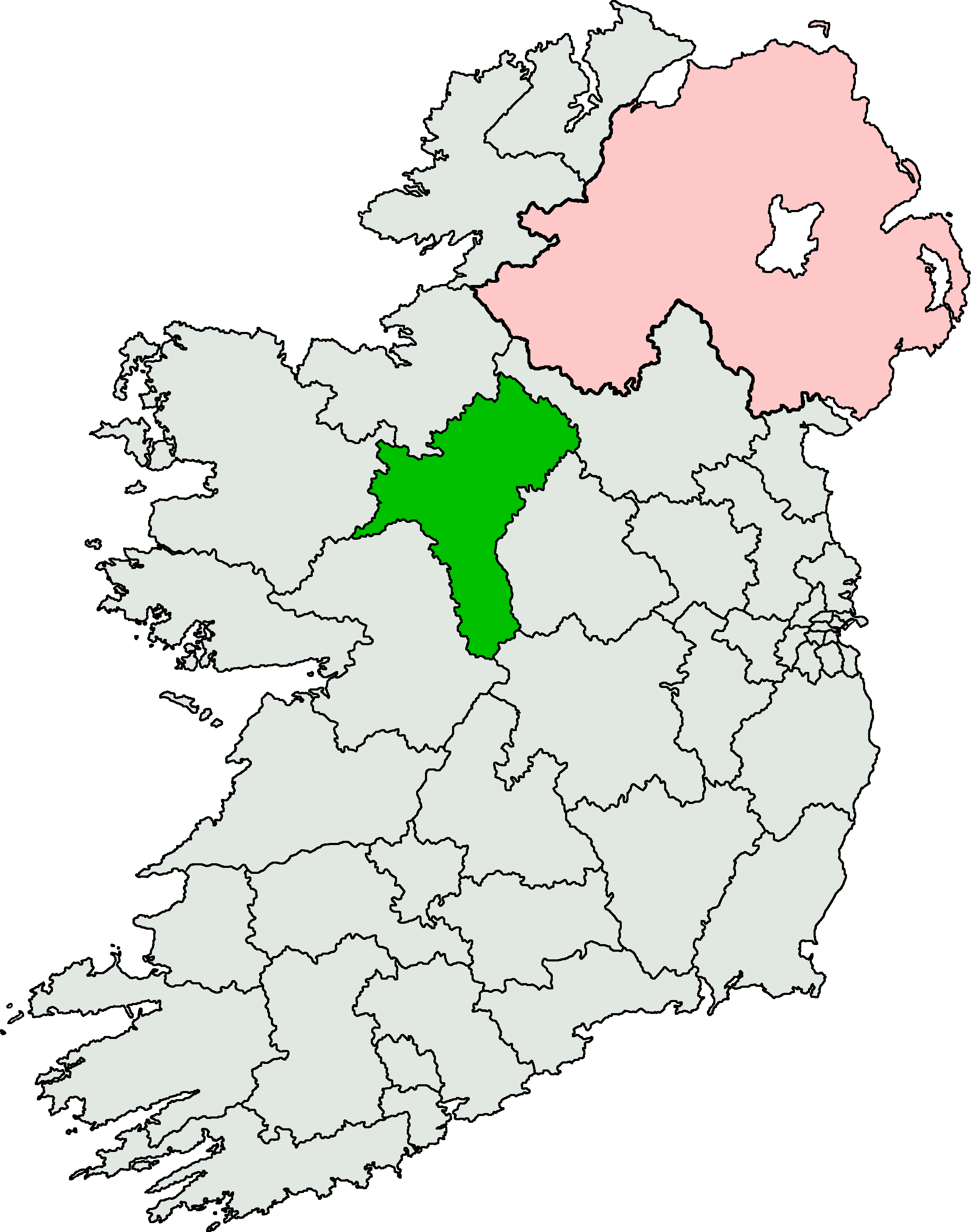
- Roscommon–South Leitrim shown within Ireland
TD before election
Luke 'Ming' Flanagan
Independent
TD after election
Michael Fitzmaurice
Independent

A Dáil by-election was held in the constituency of Roscommon–South Leitrim in Ireland on Friday, 10 October 2014, to fill a vacancy in the 31st Dáil. It followed the election of independent Teachta Dála (TD) Luke 'Ming' Flanagan to the European Parliament.

The Dublin South-West by-election was held on the same date. The Electoral (Amendment) Act 2011 required a writ for a by-election to be issued within six months of a vacancy occurring.

Independent candidate Michael Fitzmaurice was elected on the seventh count.

== Result ==
2014 Roscommon–South Leitrim by-election
Party	Candidate	FPv%	Count						
Party	Candidate	FPv%	1	2	3	4	5	6	7
Fianna Fáil	Ivan Connaughton	22.0	7,334	7,502	7,652	7,846	8,863	10,083	12,050
Independent	Michael Fitzmaurice	18.7	6,220	6,371	6,625	7,075	9,211	11,722	14,881
Sinn Féin	Martin Kenny	17.7	5,906	6,184	6,283	6,447	7,022		
Fine Gael	Maura Hopkins	16.8	5,593	5,742	5,864	6,075	7,312	8,476	
Independent	John McDermott	8.8	2,944	3,018	3,187	3,468			
Labour	John Kelly	6.1	2,037	2,060	2,090	2,144			
Independent	Emmett Corcoran	3.8	1,262	1,305	1,483				
Independent	Tom Crosby	3.1	1,030	1,063					
Independent	Des Guckian	2.7	902						
Independent	Gerry O'Boyle	0.2	82						
Electorate: 64,873 Valid: 33,310 Spoilt: 262 (0.8%) Quota: 16,656 Turnout: 33,572 (51.8%)
