= John Perry (Irish politician) =

Irish former politician (born 1956)

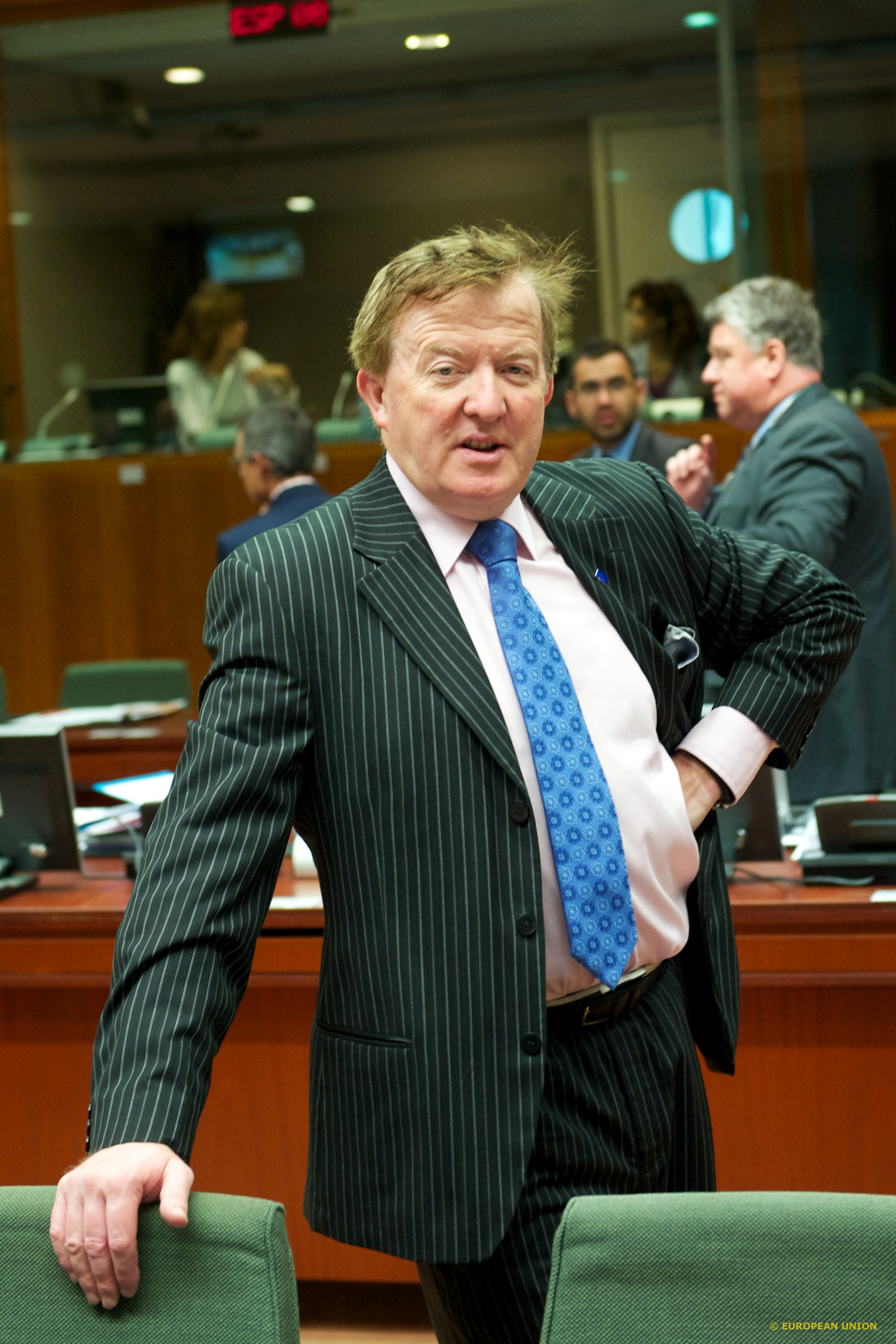
- Perry in 2014

Minister of State
- 2011–2014: Jobs, Enterprise and Innovation

Teachta Dála
- In office June 2007 – February 2016
- Constituency: Sligo–North Leitrim
- In office June 1997 – June 2007
- Constituency: Sligo–Leitrim

Personal details
- Born: 15 August 1956 (age 70) Ballymote, County Sligo, Ireland
- Party: Fine Gael; Independent (2020)
- Spouse: Marie Perry
- Children: 1

John Perry (born 15 August 1956) is an Irish former Fine Gael politician who served as a Minister of State from 2011 to 2014. He served as a Teachta Dála (TD) from 1997 to 2016.

Perry was born in Ballymote, County Sligo. He was educated at Ballymote National School and Corran College, Ballymote. Perry was first elected to Dáil Éireann at the 1997 general election for the constituency and retained his seat until his defeat in 2016. In 1997, he became Fine Gael Spokesperson on Science, Technology, Small Business and Enterprise, and the Border Counties. He was a member of Sligo County Council from 1999 to 2003, representing the Sligo–Strandhill electoral area. In June 2000, he was appointed assistant director of Organisation and Deputy Spokesperson with special responsibility for Border Issues. He held this post until February 2001.

Between September 2002 and October 2004, he was vice-chairman of the Joint Oireachtas Committee on Communications and Natural Resources. He has also served as Chairman of the Dáil Public Accounts Committee. In October 2004, he was appointed to the position as party spokesperson for the Marine, in Enda Kenny's Front Bench. He was demoted from the Front Bench after a reshuffle following the 2007 general election. In July 2010, he was appointed as Spokesman on Small Business.

On 10 March 2011, he was appointed by the Fine Gael–Labour government as Minister of State at the Department of Jobs, Enterprise and Innovation with special responsibility for Small Business.

In July 2012, he was the subject of some controversy over his claims for mileage expenses for official duties including a claim for 4,417 km of mileage in a month during which he only had two official appointments and another monthly mileage claim which averaged 344 km per day for every day he was in Ireland. In that latter month he was abroad for 9 days.

On 22 July 2013, Perry and his wife consented to a judgment of €2.47m against them at the Commercial Court over unpaid loans to Danske Bank. In September 2013, Perry confirmed that he had reached an agreement with Danske Bank, in relation to his outstanding loans. In March 2013, it was reported that Perry hired his wife, Marie, as a parliamentary assistant, contrary to government statements on appointments.

He was dropped as a Minister of State in a reshuffle in July 2014. He was reappointed to the Public Accounts Committee in December 2014.

In October 2015, Perry was not selected as Fine Gael candidate for the Sligo–Leitrim constituency at the 2016 general election. In December 2015, he took a High Court action against Fine Gael challenging the results of the selection convention. On 22 December, the Fine Gael National Executive announced it was adding Perry to the Sligo–Leitrim election ticket.

He lost his seat at the 2016 general election. He ran as an independent candidate for Sligo–Leitrim at the 2020 general election. He was eliminated on the seventh count.

Dáil	Election	Deputy (Party)	Deputy (Party)	Deputy (Party)	Deputy (Party)	Deputy (Party)
13th	1948	Eugene Gilbride (FF)	Stephen Flynn (FF)	Bernard Maguire (Ind.)	Mary Reynolds (FG)	Joseph Roddy (FG)
14th	1951	Eugene Gilbride (FF)	Stephen Flynn (FF)	Patrick Rogers (FG)	Mary Reynolds (FG)	Joseph Roddy (FG)
15th	1954	Eugene Gilbride (FF)	Stephen Flynn (FF)	Bernard Maguire (Ind.)	Mary Reynolds (FG)	Joseph Roddy (FG)
16th	1957	Eugene Gilbride (FF)	Stephen Flynn (FF)	John Joe McGirl (SF)	Mary Reynolds (FG)	Patrick Rogers (FG)
16th	1961 by-election	Eugene Gilbride (FF)	Joseph McLoughlin (FG)	John Joe McGirl (SF)	Mary Reynolds (FG)	Patrick Rogers (FG)
17th	1961	Eugene Gilbride (FF)	Joseph McLoughlin (FG)	James Gallagher (FF)	Eugene Gilhawley (FG)	4 seats 1961–1969
18th	1965	Eugene Gilbride (FF)	Joseph McLoughlin (FG)	James Gallagher (FF)	Eugene Gilhawley (FG)	4 seats 1961–1969
19th	1969	Ray MacSharry (FF)	Joseph McLoughlin (FG)	James Gallagher (FF)	3 seats 1969–1981	
20th	1973	Ray MacSharry (FF)	Joseph McLoughlin (FG)	Eugene Gilhawley (FG)	3 seats 1969–1981	
21st	1977	Ray MacSharry (FF)	James Gallagher (FF)	Eugene Gilhawley (FG)	3 seats 1969–1981	
22nd	1981	Ray MacSharry (FF)	John Ellis (FF)	Joe McCartin (FG)	Ted Nealon (FG)	4 seats 1981–2007
23rd	1982 (Feb)	Ray MacSharry (FF)	John Ellis (FF)	Matt Brennan (FF)	Ted Nealon (FG)	4 seats 1981–2007
24th	1982 (Nov)	Ray MacSharry (FF)	Joe McCartin (FG)	Matt Brennan (FF)	Ted Nealon (FG)	4 seats 1981–2007
25th	1987	Ray MacSharry (FF)	John Ellis (FF)	Matt Brennan (FF)	Ted Nealon (FG)	4 seats 1981–2007
26th	1989	Gerry Reynolds (FG)	John Ellis (FF)	Matt Brennan (FF)	Ted Nealon (FG)	4 seats 1981–2007
27th	1992	Declan Bree (Lab)	John Ellis (FF)	Matt Brennan (FF)	Ted Nealon (FG)	4 seats 1981–2007
28th	1997	Gerry Reynolds (FG)	John Ellis (FF)	Matt Brennan (FF)	John Perry (FG)	4 seats 1981–2007
29th	2002	Marian Harkin (Ind.)	John Ellis (FF)	Jimmy Devins (FF)	John Perry (FG)	4 seats 1981–2007
30th	2007	Constituency abolished. See Sligo–North Leitrim and Roscommon–South Leitrim				

Dáil	Election	Deputy (Party)	Deputy (Party)	Deputy (Party)	Deputy (Party)
32nd	2016	Martin Kenny (SF)	Marc MacSharry (FF)	Eamon Scanlon (FF)	Tony McLoughlin (FG)
33rd	2020	Martin Kenny (SF)	Marc MacSharry (FF)	Marian Harkin (Ind.)	Frank Feighan (FG)
34th	2024	Martin Kenny (SF)	Eamon Scanlon (FF)	Marian Harkin (Ind.)	Frank Feighan (FG)

Dáil	Election	Deputy (Party)	Deputy (Party)	Deputy (Party)
30th	2007	Jimmy Devins (FF)	Eamon Scanlon (FF)	John Perry (FG)
31st	2011	Michael Colreavy (SF)	Tony McLoughlin (FG)	John Perry (FG)
32nd	2016	Constituency abolished. See Sligo–Leitrim		
