= Michael Comiskey =

Irish politician (born 1953)

Senator
- In office 25 May 2011 – 8 June 2016
- Constituency: Agricultural Panel

Personal details
- Born: 1 October 1953 (age 72) Manorhamilton, County Leitrim, Ireland
- Party: Fine Gael

Michael Comiskey (born 1 October 1953) is an Irish Fine Gael politician, a former senator and farmer. He was elected to the 24th Seanad in April 2011 on the Agricultural Panel. He was an unsuccessful candidate at the 2007 general election for the Sligo–North Leitrim constituency, polling 4,936 first preference votes (12.4%). He also unsuccessfully contested the 2007 Seanad election.

He is a member of the Irish Farmers' Association (IFA) and is a former chairman of County Leitrim branch of the IFA.

He was the Fine Gael Seanad spokesperson on Agriculture, Marine and Food during his term.
