= John Ellis (Fianna Fáil politician) =

Irish former politician (born 1952)

Senator
- In office 13 September 2007 – 25 May 2011
- Constituency: Nominated by the Taoiseach
- In office 23 February 1983 – 17 February 1987
- In office 27 October 1977 – 11 June 1981
- Constituency: Agricultural Panel

Teachta Dála
- In office February 1987 – May 2007
- In office June 1981 – November 1982
- Constituency: Sligo–Leitrim

Personal details
- Born: 2 May 1952 (age 73) Fenagh, County Leitrim, Ireland
- Party: Fianna Fáil
- Spouse: Patricia Donnelly
- Children: 3

John Ellis (born 2 May 1952) is an Irish former Fianna Fáil politician, who was a Teachta Dála (TD) and Senator between 1977 and 2011.

Born in Fenagh, County Leitrim, Ellis was a farmer and businessman before entering politics. He is married with three children.

He was elected as a member of Leitrim County Council in 1974, and served as the council chairman from 1986 to 1987 and from 1992 to 1993.

He first entered the Oireachtas in 1977, when he was elected to the 14th Seanad by the Agricultural Panel. He was first elected to Dáil Éireann at the 1981 general election for the Sligo–Leitrim constituency, and held the seat at the February 1982 general election. In a most unusual occurrence, Ellis lost his seat at the November 1982 general election despite topping the poll on the first count.

In 1983 he was elected to the 17th Seanad, again by the Agricultural Panel. He stood again in Sligo–Leitrim at the 1987 general election, and was returned to the 25th Dáil. He was re-elected at the 1989, 1992, 1997 and 2002 general elections. Boundary changes then placed him in the newly created Roscommon–South Leitrim constituency; he stood for election there at the 2007 general election, but failed to win a seat. He was nominated by the Taoiseach, Bertie Ahern, to the Seanad on 3 August 2007. He retired from politics in 2011.

Ellis was involved in a controversy owing to the Stanlow Trading scandal of the late 1980s, where 80 families were left unpaid by the company, set up by him and his two brothers, Caillian and Richard.

Dáil	Election	Deputy (Party)	Deputy (Party)	Deputy (Party)	Deputy (Party)	Deputy (Party)
13th	1948	Eugene Gilbride (FF)	Stephen Flynn (FF)	Bernard Maguire (Ind.)	Mary Reynolds (FG)	Joseph Roddy (FG)
14th	1951	Eugene Gilbride (FF)	Stephen Flynn (FF)	Patrick Rogers (FG)	Mary Reynolds (FG)	Joseph Roddy (FG)
15th	1954	Eugene Gilbride (FF)	Stephen Flynn (FF)	Bernard Maguire (Ind.)	Mary Reynolds (FG)	Joseph Roddy (FG)
16th	1957	Eugene Gilbride (FF)	Stephen Flynn (FF)	John Joe McGirl (SF)	Mary Reynolds (FG)	Patrick Rogers (FG)
16th	1961 by-election	Eugene Gilbride (FF)	Joseph McLoughlin (FG)	John Joe McGirl (SF)	Mary Reynolds (FG)	Patrick Rogers (FG)
17th	1961	Eugene Gilbride (FF)	Joseph McLoughlin (FG)	James Gallagher (FF)	Eugene Gilhawley (FG)	4 seats 1961–1969
18th	1965	Eugene Gilbride (FF)	Joseph McLoughlin (FG)	James Gallagher (FF)	Eugene Gilhawley (FG)	4 seats 1961–1969
19th	1969	Ray MacSharry (FF)	Joseph McLoughlin (FG)	James Gallagher (FF)	3 seats 1969–1981	
20th	1973	Ray MacSharry (FF)	Joseph McLoughlin (FG)	Eugene Gilhawley (FG)	3 seats 1969–1981	
21st	1977	Ray MacSharry (FF)	James Gallagher (FF)	Eugene Gilhawley (FG)	3 seats 1969–1981	
22nd	1981	Ray MacSharry (FF)	John Ellis (FF)	Joe McCartin (FG)	Ted Nealon (FG)	4 seats 1981–2007
23rd	1982 (Feb)	Ray MacSharry (FF)	John Ellis (FF)	Matt Brennan (FF)	Ted Nealon (FG)	4 seats 1981–2007
24th	1982 (Nov)	Ray MacSharry (FF)	Joe McCartin (FG)	Matt Brennan (FF)	Ted Nealon (FG)	4 seats 1981–2007
25th	1987	Ray MacSharry (FF)	John Ellis (FF)	Matt Brennan (FF)	Ted Nealon (FG)	4 seats 1981–2007
26th	1989	Gerry Reynolds (FG)	John Ellis (FF)	Matt Brennan (FF)	Ted Nealon (FG)	4 seats 1981–2007
27th	1992	Declan Bree (Lab)	John Ellis (FF)	Matt Brennan (FF)	Ted Nealon (FG)	4 seats 1981–2007
28th	1997	Gerry Reynolds (FG)	John Ellis (FF)	Matt Brennan (FF)	John Perry (FG)	4 seats 1981–2007
29th	2002	Marian Harkin (Ind.)	John Ellis (FF)	Jimmy Devins (FF)	John Perry (FG)	4 seats 1981–2007
30th	2007	Constituency abolished. See Sligo–North Leitrim and Roscommon–South Leitrim				

Dáil	Election	Deputy (Party)	Deputy (Party)	Deputy (Party)	Deputy (Party)
32nd	2016	Martin Kenny (SF)	Marc MacSharry (FF)	Eamon Scanlon (FF)	Tony McLoughlin (FG)
33rd	2020	Martin Kenny (SF)	Marc MacSharry (FF)	Marian Harkin (Ind.)	Frank Feighan (FG)
34th	2024	Martin Kenny (SF)	Eamon Scanlon (FF)	Marian Harkin (Ind.)	Frank Feighan (FG)
