= Marc MacSharry =

Irish former politician (born 1973)

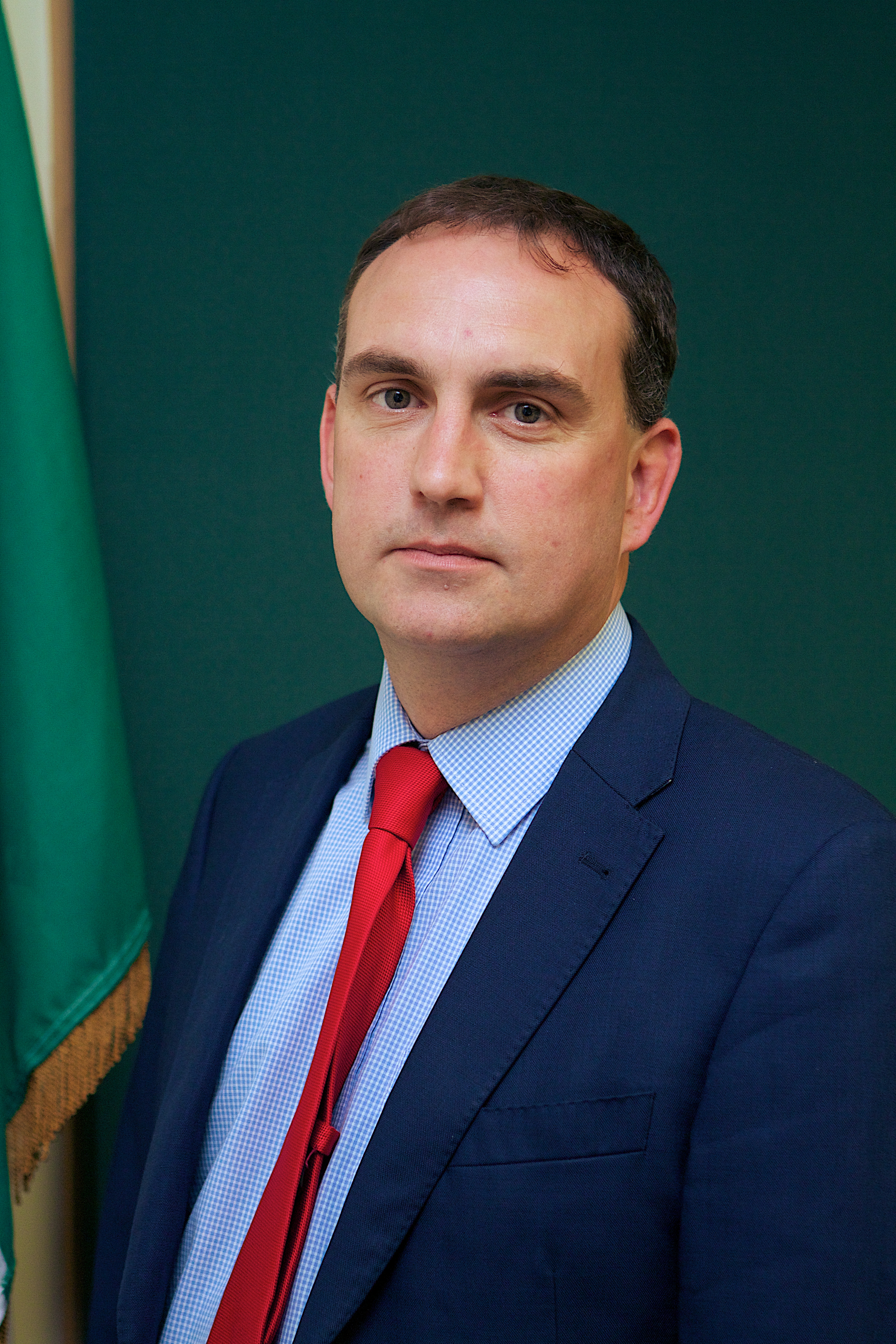
- MacSharry in 2014

Teachta Dála
- In office February 2016 – November 2024
- Constituency: Sligo–Leitrim

Senator
- In office 12 September 2002 – 26 February 2016
- Constituency: Industrial and Commercial Panel

Personal details
- Born: 12 July 1973 (age 52) Dublin, Ireland
- Party: Independent
- Other political affiliations: Fianna Fáil (until 2022)
- Spouse: Marie Murphy (m. 2003; sep. 2016)
- Children: 3
- Parent: Ray MacSharry (father)
- Education: Castleknock College

Marc MacSharry (born 12 July 1973) is an Irish former politician who served as a Teachta Dála (TD) for Sligo–Leitrim from 2016 to 2024. From 2002 to 2016, he was a Fianna Fáil Senator on the Industrial and Commercial Panel. He resigned from Fianna Fáil's parliamentary party in September 2021, alleging double standards. He resigned his Fianna Fáil membership in November 2022, amid claims he had bullied colleagues.

== Early life ==
MacSharry was born in Dublin in 1973 to Ray MacSharry, the former Tánaiste and European Commissioner, and his wife Elaine Neilan (died 2008). He was educated in Sligo and at Castleknock College, Dublin and is currently an M.Phil. research masters candidate at the University of Ulster.

Prior and in parallel to his political career, MacSharry worked in the financial services sector with Irish Permanent Building Society and Irish Permanent Finance (now Irish Life and Permanent) between 1992 and 1995, and as a chief executive officer of Sligo Chamber of Commerce & Industry between 2000 and 2005. He marketed and exported meat products throughout the world with Celtic Foods Ltd from 1995 to 2000 and provided consultancy to other meat export firms from 2000 to 2002. He ran his own estate agency and property solutions provider from 2006 to 2017.

== Political career ==
=== Seanad Éireann (2002–2016) ===
Following his election to the Seanad in 2002, he was appointed Seanad spokesperson on Communications, Marine and Natural Resources. He was re-elected in 2007 and was appointed Seanad spokesperson on Finance.

On 31 January 2011, prior to that year's general election, MacSharry was appointed to the Fianna Fáil frontbench by the new party leader Micheál Martin, as spokesperson on Tourism and Arts. MacSharry was a candidate at the 2011 general election in the Sligo–North Leitrim constituency, but was not elected. He was re-elected to the Seanad in April 2011 and was appointed Fianna Fáil Seanad spokesperson on Health.

Following the 2008 financial crisis and the consequent mortgage arrears crisis which ensued in Ireland, MacSharry co-founded the prevention of family home repossessions group, advocating for the protection of the family home.

MacSharry introduced the Family Home Bill 2011 in July 2011 in the Seanad, which would effectively have prevented the granting of an order for the repossession of a primary family residence except in very exceptional circumstances where borrowers were in difficulty due exclusively to willful neglect. The bill was narrowly defeated in the Seanad.

In 2012, collaborating with Seanad colleague and professor of oncology at St Vincent's Hospital in Dublin, John Crown, MacSharry introduced the Access to Cancer Treatment Bill to the Seanad which sought to simplify the approval process to ensure early access for patients to avail of expensive breakthrough cancer drugs. The bill was defeated by one vote.

MacSharry authored a Fianna Fáil policy paper in February 2013 entitled, Actions Speak Louder than Words, which promoted the case for and approach to be taken for a reduction in loss of life through suicide by 30 percent. To progress proposals to increase funding for suicide prevention and mental health measures, he introduced the Suicide Prevention and Mental Health Fund Bill in 2014 to the Seanad which was defeated.

=== Dáil Éireann (2016–2024) ===
In the 2016 general election, MacSharry was elected on his second attempt, topping the poll in the newly reformed Sligo–Leitrim constituency with 8,856 votes (14.2%), to take a seat in the constituency his father Ray had served in.

In 2018, the Dáil was suspended for ten minutes because of an allegedly antisemitic remark made by MacSharry. While discussing the reduction of hours in a Garda station in Donegal town, MacSharry alleged that the government was like Nazi propaganda minister Joseph Goebbels, and shouted "Goebbels" at the government's benches. Minister for Justice Charles Flanagan and Minister for Health Simon Harris called on MacSharry to withdraw the remark, with Harris calling the comment "anti-semitic" and "an attack on the Jewish Community", but MacSharry's Fianna Fáil colleague, Ceann Comhairle Sean O Fearghail, did not call on MacSharry to withdraw the remark.

In 2020, MacSharry was re-elected in the same constituency, albeit with a reduced share of 7,004 votes (11.5%), being elected on the final count over his Fianna Fáil running mate Eamon Scanlon.

MacSharry caused controversy in 2020 when he accused public servants of "laziness" and said they were "using the COVID-19 crisis as an excuse to "lie on the couch and watch box sets". The Association of Higher Civil and Public Servants called on MacSharry to withdraw the remark, calling it "ill-informed and ill-considered" and requesting an apology from MacSharry, but MacSharry refused to, saying "Of course, such comments aren't popular, but it needs to be said."

MacSharry criticised Fáilte Ireland and his Fianna Fáil colleague at the time Stephen Donnelly on the public health guidelines they had issued regarding the opening of pubs and restaurants across Ireland, comparing them to the East German intelligence agency the Stasi.

In January 2021, MacSharry attracted further controversy for his comments made during a Fianna Fáil parliamentary party meeting, in which he said that "if the Ku Klux Klan were selling a COVID-19 vaccine, Ireland should buy it".

During his time in Fianna Fáil, MacSharry was very critical of Micheál Martin, calling on him to resign as leader of Fianna Fáil multiple times. He first called on Martin to resign in June 2021 after it had emerged Fianna Fáil had used covertly polled voters while pretending to be independent pollsters. In July 2021, MacSharry again called on Martin to resign after Fianna Fáil's poor performance in the 2021 Dublin Bay South by-election, in which Fianna Fáil's candidate Deidre Conroy received under 5 percent of the vote. It was revealed that month that MacSharry was seeking out TDs in his party to put forward a motion of no confidence in Martin.

MacSharry published a paper, Now More Than Ever in July 2021 on the impact of COVID-19 related restrictions on the mental health of society suggesting no further lockdowns should be considered.

On 15 September 2021, MacSharry resigned from the Fianna Fáil parliamentary party in order to vote against Simon Coveney of Fine Gael in a motion of no confidence resulting from the Katherine Zappone controversy.

On 2 November 2022, MacSharry was prevented from rejoining Fianna Fáil following a row over the handling of a bullying complaint against him.

On 18 October 2023, MacSharry announced that he would not contest the next general election.

== Personal life ==
MacSharry was married to Marie Murphy from 2003 to 2016, when they separated. MacSharry has three children and lives in Strandhill, County Sligo.

MacSharry was an amateur actor appearing in several stage productions, winning the All-Ireland One-Act Drama Championship in 1997 and performing at a world drama festival in Monte Carlo with the Carlow Little Theatre Festival in August of that year.

== See also ==
- Families in the Oireachtas

Dáil	Election	Deputy (Party)	Deputy (Party)	Deputy (Party)	Deputy (Party)	Deputy (Party)
13th	1948	Eugene Gilbride (FF)	Stephen Flynn (FF)	Bernard Maguire (Ind.)	Mary Reynolds (FG)	Joseph Roddy (FG)
14th	1951	Eugene Gilbride (FF)	Stephen Flynn (FF)	Patrick Rogers (FG)	Mary Reynolds (FG)	Joseph Roddy (FG)
15th	1954	Eugene Gilbride (FF)	Stephen Flynn (FF)	Bernard Maguire (Ind.)	Mary Reynolds (FG)	Joseph Roddy (FG)
16th	1957	Eugene Gilbride (FF)	Stephen Flynn (FF)	John Joe McGirl (SF)	Mary Reynolds (FG)	Patrick Rogers (FG)
16th	1961 by-election	Eugene Gilbride (FF)	Joseph McLoughlin (FG)	John Joe McGirl (SF)	Mary Reynolds (FG)	Patrick Rogers (FG)
17th	1961	Eugene Gilbride (FF)	Joseph McLoughlin (FG)	James Gallagher (FF)	Eugene Gilhawley (FG)	4 seats 1961–1969
18th	1965	Eugene Gilbride (FF)	Joseph McLoughlin (FG)	James Gallagher (FF)	Eugene Gilhawley (FG)	4 seats 1961–1969
19th	1969	Ray MacSharry (FF)	Joseph McLoughlin (FG)	James Gallagher (FF)	3 seats 1969–1981	
20th	1973	Ray MacSharry (FF)	Joseph McLoughlin (FG)	Eugene Gilhawley (FG)	3 seats 1969–1981	
21st	1977	Ray MacSharry (FF)	James Gallagher (FF)	Eugene Gilhawley (FG)	3 seats 1969–1981	
22nd	1981	Ray MacSharry (FF)	John Ellis (FF)	Joe McCartin (FG)	Ted Nealon (FG)	4 seats 1981–2007
23rd	1982 (Feb)	Ray MacSharry (FF)	John Ellis (FF)	Matt Brennan (FF)	Ted Nealon (FG)	4 seats 1981–2007
24th	1982 (Nov)	Ray MacSharry (FF)	Joe McCartin (FG)	Matt Brennan (FF)	Ted Nealon (FG)	4 seats 1981–2007
25th	1987	Ray MacSharry (FF)	John Ellis (FF)	Matt Brennan (FF)	Ted Nealon (FG)	4 seats 1981–2007
26th	1989	Gerry Reynolds (FG)	John Ellis (FF)	Matt Brennan (FF)	Ted Nealon (FG)	4 seats 1981–2007
27th	1992	Declan Bree (Lab)	John Ellis (FF)	Matt Brennan (FF)	Ted Nealon (FG)	4 seats 1981–2007
28th	1997	Gerry Reynolds (FG)	John Ellis (FF)	Matt Brennan (FF)	John Perry (FG)	4 seats 1981–2007
29th	2002	Marian Harkin (Ind.)	John Ellis (FF)	Jimmy Devins (FF)	John Perry (FG)	4 seats 1981–2007
30th	2007	Constituency abolished. See Sligo–North Leitrim and Roscommon–South Leitrim				

Dáil	Election	Deputy (Party)	Deputy (Party)	Deputy (Party)	Deputy (Party)
32nd	2016	Martin Kenny (SF)	Marc MacSharry (FF)	Eamon Scanlon (FF)	Tony McLoughlin (FG)
33rd	2020	Martin Kenny (SF)	Marc MacSharry (FF)	Marian Harkin (Ind.)	Frank Feighan (FG)
34th	2024	Martin Kenny (SF)	Eamon Scanlon (FF)	Marian Harkin (Ind.)	Frank Feighan (FG)
