= Sligo–North Leitrim =

Dáil constituency (2007–2016)

- Former Dáil constituency
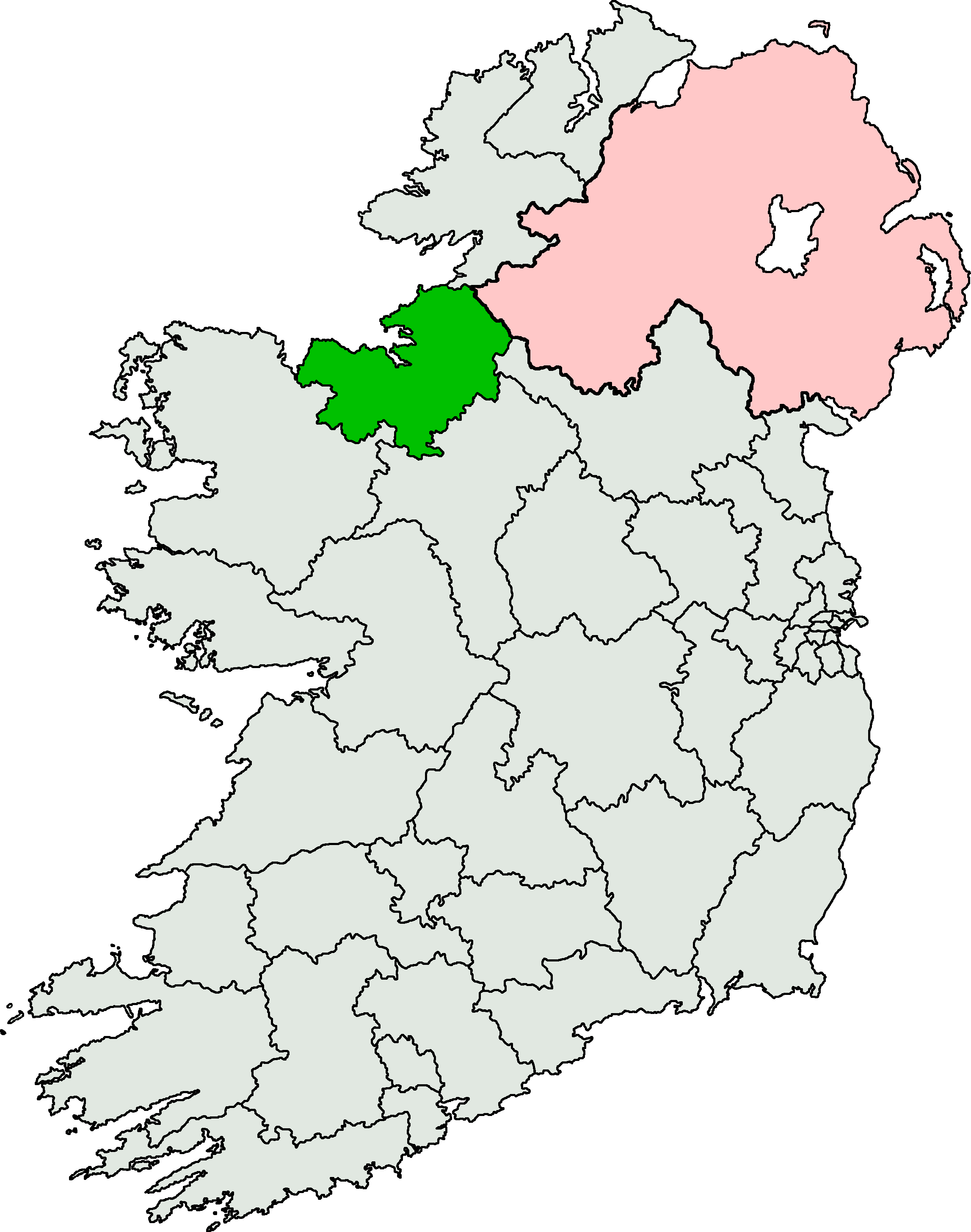
- Location of Sligo–North Leitrim within Ireland

Former constituency
- Created: 2007
- Abolished: 2016
- Seats: 3
- Local government areas: County Sligo; County Leitrim
- Created from: Sligo–Leitrim
- Replaced by: Sligo–Leitrim

Sligo–North Leitrim was a parliamentary constituency represented in Dáil Éireann, the lower house of the Irish parliament or Oireachtas, from 2007 to 2016. The constituency elected 3 deputies (Teachtaí Dála, commonly known as TDs). The method of election was proportional representation by means of the single transferable vote (PR-STV).

== History and boundaries ==
The constituency was created by the Electoral (Amendment) Act 2005, which gave effect to the 2004 Constituency Commission Report on Dáil Constituencies and was first used at the 2007 general election. It largely replaced the previous constituency of Sligo–Leitrim, although it ceded the southern half of Leitrim to the new constituency of Roscommon–South Leitrim, though a subsequent revision in 2007 restored a portion of South Leitrim to the constituency. It consisted of all of County Sligo and the parts of County Leitrim, contained in the Local Electoral Areas of Dromahair and Manorhamilton.

The Electoral (Amendment) Act 2009 defined the constituency as:

"The county of Sligo and the county of Leitrim, except the part thereof which is comprised in the constituency of Roscommon–South Leitrim."

It was abolished at the 2016 general election and replaced by the re-created Sligo–Leitrim constituency.

== TDs ==
Teachtaí Dála (TDs) for Sligo–North Leitrim 2007–2016
Key to parties: FF = Fianna Fáil; FG = Fine Gael; SF = Sinn Féin
Dáil	Election	Deputy (Party)	Deputy (Party)	Deputy (Party)
30th	2007	Jimmy Devins (FF)	Eamon Scanlon (FF)	John Perry (FG)
31st	2011	Michael Colreavy (SF)	Tony McLoughlin (FG)	John Perry (FG)
32nd	2016	Constituency abolished. See Sligo–Leitrim		

Note: The columns in this table are used only for presentational purposes, and no significance should be attached to the order of columns. For details of the order in which seats were won at each election, see the detailed results of that election.

== Elections ==
*: Outgoing TD

=== 2011 general election ===
2011 general election: Sligo–North Leitrim
Party	Candidate	FPv%	Count								
Party	Candidate	FPv%	1	2	3	4	5	6	7	8	9
Fine Gael	John Perry	19.5	8,663	8,703	8,741	8,968	9,548	9,768	10,419	11,973	
Fine Gael	Tony McLoughlin	17.4	7,715	7,778	7,891	8,127	8,320	8,699	9,493	10,981	11,508
Sinn Féin	Michael Colreavy	13.3	5,911	5,972	6,232	6,465	6,846	7,775	8,139	9,616	9,771
Fianna Fáil	Eamon Scanlon	11.4	5,075	5,097	5,165	5,235	5,625	5,699	8,389	8,942	9,125
Fianna Fáil	Marc MacSharry	10.4	4,633	4,647	4,686	4,865	5,302	5,586			
Labour	Susan O'Keeffe	10.2	4,553	4,709	4,769	5,213	5,430	6,096	6,646		
Independent	Michael Clarke	5.4	2,415	2,431	2,463	2,607					
Independent	Declan Bree (Note: Bree campaigned as a member of the United Left Alliance.)	5.1	2,284	2,334	2,380	2,763	2,946				
Independent	Veronica Cawley	2.5	1,119	1,140	1,171						
New Vision	Alwyn Love (Note: New Vision was an electoral alliance of independent non-party candidates and did not appear on the ballot.)	1.8	779	836	881						
Independent	Gabriel McSharry	1.7	747	770							
Green	Johnny Gogan	1.0	432								
Independent	Dick Cahill	0.2	102								
Electorate: 63,432 Valid: 44,428 Spoilt: 409 (0.9%) Quota: 11,108 Turnout: 44,837 (70.7%)

=== 2007 general election ===
2007 general election: Sligo–North Leitrim
Party	Candidate	FPv%	Count				
Party	Candidate	FPv%	1	2	3	4	5
Fianna Fáil	Eamon Scanlon	23.2	9,258	9,317	9,390	9,662	10,771
Fine Gael	John Perry	19.8	7,910	7,952	8,086	9,493	10,363
Fianna Fáil	Jimmy Devins	17.8	7,102	7,168	7,288	7,904	9,187
Fine Gael	Michael Comiskey	12.4	4,936	5,016	5,171	6,732	7,757
Sinn Féin	Seán MacManus	11.7	4,684	4,784	5,075	5,769	
Fine Gael	Imelda Henry	7.1	2,837	2,863	2,987		
Labour	Jim McGarry	3.9	1,555	1,571	1,829		
Green	Brian Scanlon	3.0	1,209	1,240			
Independent	Andy McSharry	0.9	353				
Independent	John Higgins	0.2	89				
Electorate: 57,517 Valid: 39,934 Spoilt: 396 (1.0%) Quota: 9,984 Turnout: 40,330 (70.1%)

== See also ==
- Dáil constituencies
- Politics of the Republic of Ireland
- Historic Dáil constituencies
- Elections in the Republic of Ireland
