= Tony McLoughlin =

Irish former politician (born 1949)

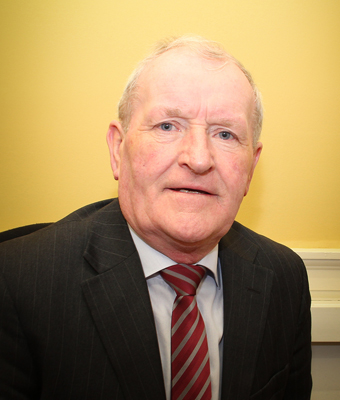
- McLoughlin in 2016

Teachta Dála
- In office February 2016 – February 2020
- Constituency: Sligo–Leitrim
- In office February 2011 – February 2016
- Constituency: Sligo–North Leitrim

Sligo County Councillor
- In office June 1999 – February 2011
- Constituency: Sligo Strandhill
- In office June 1985 – June 1999
- Constituency: Ballymote
- In office June 1974 – June 1985
- Constituency: Sligo

Personal details
- Born: 19 January 1949 (age 77) Sligo, Ireland
- Party: Fine Gael
- Spouse: Paula McLoughlin
- Children: 3
- Relatives: Joseph McLoughlin (uncle)
- Education: University College Dublin

Tony McLoughlin (born 19 January 1949) is an Irish former Fine Gael politician who served as a Teachta Dála (TD) for the Sligo–Leitrim constituency from 2011 to 2020.

He was elected to Sligo County Council in 1974 and was subsequently elected to Sligo Borough Council in 1979, in place of his father Pat. He has served four separate terms as Mayor of Sligo.

McLoughlin is a nephew of Joseph McLoughlin, who was a Fine Gael TD for the Sligo–Leitrim constituency from 1961 to 1977.

In 2017, McLoughlin's Private Members Legislation to provide for the prohibition of the exploration and extraction of petroleum from shale rock, tight sands and coal seams in the Irish onshore and Ireland's internal waters was enacted and the process otherwise known as Fracking was banned in Ireland.

In June 2018, McLoughlin announced that he would not be contesting the next general election.

== See also ==
- Families in the Oireachtas

Dáil	Election	Deputy (Party)	Deputy (Party)	Deputy (Party)
30th	2007	Jimmy Devins (FF)	Eamon Scanlon (FF)	John Perry (FG)
31st	2011	Michael Colreavy (SF)	Tony McLoughlin (FG)	John Perry (FG)
32nd	2016	Constituency abolished. See Sligo–Leitrim		

Dáil	Election	Deputy (Party)	Deputy (Party)	Deputy (Party)	Deputy (Party)	Deputy (Party)
13th	1948	Eugene Gilbride (FF)	Stephen Flynn (FF)	Bernard Maguire (Ind.)	Mary Reynolds (FG)	Joseph Roddy (FG)
14th	1951	Eugene Gilbride (FF)	Stephen Flynn (FF)	Patrick Rogers (FG)	Mary Reynolds (FG)	Joseph Roddy (FG)
15th	1954	Eugene Gilbride (FF)	Stephen Flynn (FF)	Bernard Maguire (Ind.)	Mary Reynolds (FG)	Joseph Roddy (FG)
16th	1957	Eugene Gilbride (FF)	Stephen Flynn (FF)	John Joe McGirl (SF)	Mary Reynolds (FG)	Patrick Rogers (FG)
16th	1961 by-election	Eugene Gilbride (FF)	Joseph McLoughlin (FG)	John Joe McGirl (SF)	Mary Reynolds (FG)	Patrick Rogers (FG)
17th	1961	Eugene Gilbride (FF)	Joseph McLoughlin (FG)	James Gallagher (FF)	Eugene Gilhawley (FG)	4 seats 1961–1969
18th	1965	Eugene Gilbride (FF)	Joseph McLoughlin (FG)	James Gallagher (FF)	Eugene Gilhawley (FG)	4 seats 1961–1969
19th	1969	Ray MacSharry (FF)	Joseph McLoughlin (FG)	James Gallagher (FF)	3 seats 1969–1981	
20th	1973	Ray MacSharry (FF)	Joseph McLoughlin (FG)	Eugene Gilhawley (FG)	3 seats 1969–1981	
21st	1977	Ray MacSharry (FF)	James Gallagher (FF)	Eugene Gilhawley (FG)	3 seats 1969–1981	
22nd	1981	Ray MacSharry (FF)	John Ellis (FF)	Joe McCartin (FG)	Ted Nealon (FG)	4 seats 1981–2007
23rd	1982 (Feb)	Ray MacSharry (FF)	John Ellis (FF)	Matt Brennan (FF)	Ted Nealon (FG)	4 seats 1981–2007
24th	1982 (Nov)	Ray MacSharry (FF)	Joe McCartin (FG)	Matt Brennan (FF)	Ted Nealon (FG)	4 seats 1981–2007
25th	1987	Ray MacSharry (FF)	John Ellis (FF)	Matt Brennan (FF)	Ted Nealon (FG)	4 seats 1981–2007
26th	1989	Gerry Reynolds (FG)	John Ellis (FF)	Matt Brennan (FF)	Ted Nealon (FG)	4 seats 1981–2007
27th	1992	Declan Bree (Lab)	John Ellis (FF)	Matt Brennan (FF)	Ted Nealon (FG)	4 seats 1981–2007
28th	1997	Gerry Reynolds (FG)	John Ellis (FF)	Matt Brennan (FF)	John Perry (FG)	4 seats 1981–2007
29th	2002	Marian Harkin (Ind.)	John Ellis (FF)	Jimmy Devins (FF)	John Perry (FG)	4 seats 1981–2007
30th	2007	Constituency abolished. See Sligo–North Leitrim and Roscommon–South Leitrim				

Dáil	Election	Deputy (Party)	Deputy (Party)	Deputy (Party)	Deputy (Party)
32nd	2016	Martin Kenny (SF)	Marc MacSharry (FF)	Eamon Scanlon (FF)	Tony McLoughlin (FG)
33rd	2020	Martin Kenny (SF)	Marc MacSharry (FF)	Marian Harkin (Ind.)	Frank Feighan (FG)
34th	2024	Martin Kenny (SF)	Eamon Scanlon (FF)	Marian Harkin (Ind.)	Frank Feighan (FG)
