= Electoral (Amendment) Act 2009 =

Irish law setting constituencies in use at Dáil elections from 2011 to 2016

Oireachtas
- Long title: AN ACT TO REVISE DÁIL AND EUROPEAN PARLIAMENT CONSTITUENCIES, TO PROVIDE FOR THE NUMBER OF MEMBERS TO BE ELECTED FOR SUCH CONSTITUENCIES, TO AMEND THE LAW RELATING TO THE CONSTITUENCY COMMISSION, AND FOR THOSE AND OTHER PURPOSES TO AMEND THE EUROPEAN PARLIAMENT ELECTIONS ACT 1997 AND CERTAIN OTHER ENACTMENTS, TO AMEND AND GIVE STATUTORY EFFECT TO THE LOCAL ELECTIONS REGULATIONS 1995 AND TO PROVIDE FOR RELATED MATTERS
- Citation: No. 4 of 2009
- Signed: 24 February 2009
- Commenced: 24 February 2009 & 1 February 2011

Legislative history
- Bill citation: No. 38 of 2008
- Introduced by: Minister for the Environment, Heritage and Local Government (John Gormley)
- Introduced: 27 June 2008

Amends
- Electoral (Amendment) Act 2005

Amended by
- Electoral (Amendment) (Dáil Constituencies) Act 2013

The Electoral (Amendment) Act 2009 (No. 4) is a law of Ireland which amended electoral law, including revisions to Dáil constituencies and European Parliament constituencies in light of the 2006 census. The new European Parliament constituencies were used at the election in June 2009. The revision to Dáil constituencies took effect on the dissolution of the 30th Dáil on 1 February 2011 and a general election for the 31st Dáil on the revised constituencies took place on 25 February 2011.

== Revision to constituencies ==
In April 2007, the Minister for the Environment, Heritage and Local Government established an independent Constituency Commission under the terms of the Electoral Act 1997. Its report proposed several changes to Dáil constituencies. The commission was chaired by Iarfhlaith O'Neill, judge of the High Court, and delivered its report later in 2007.

The Act implemented the recommendations of this report and repealed the Electoral (Amendment) (No. 2) Act 1998, which had defined constituencies since the 2007 general election. The size of the Dáil remained at 166, arranged in 43 constituencies.

The Dáil constituencies in this Act were repealed by the Electoral (Amendment) (Dáil Constituencies) Act 2013, which created a new schedule of constituencies first used at the 2016 general election for the 32nd Dáil held on 26 February 2016.

== Electoral law amendments ==
The Act amended the provisions of the Electoral Act 1997 on the establishment of the Constituency Commission to provide that it would be established on the release of preliminary results of the census. This was in response to finding of the High Court in Murphy v. Minister for Environment (2007). It also amended the European Parliament Elections Act 1997 and the Local Elections Regulations to amend the provisions for the nomination of Independent candidates. This was in response to the finding of the Supreme Court in Cooney v. Minister for the Environment (2006).

== Constituencies for the 31st Dáil ==
Explanation of columns

- Constituency: The name of the constituency.
- Created: The year of the election when a constituency of the same name was last created.
- Seats: The number of TDs elected from the constituency under the Act.
- Change: Change in the number of seats since the last distribution of seats (which took effect in 2007).

Constituency	Created	Seats	Change
Carlow–Kilkenny	1948	5	none
Cavan–Monaghan	1977	5	none
Clare	1921	4	none
Cork East	1981	4	none
Cork North-Central	1981	4	none
Cork North-West	1981	3	none
Cork South-Central	1981	5	none
Cork South-West	1961	3	none
Donegal North-East	1981	3	none
Donegal South-West	1981	3	none
Dublin Central	1981	4	none
Dublin Mid-West	2002	4	none
Dublin North	1981	4	none
Dublin North-Central	1948	3	none
Dublin North-East	1981	3	none
Dublin North-West	1981	3	none
Dublin South	1981	5	none
Dublin South-Central	1948	5	none
Dublin South-East	1948	4	none
Dublin South-West	1981	4	none
Dublin West	1981	4	+1
Dún Laoghaire	1977	4	−1
Galway East	1977	4	none
Galway West	1937	5	none
Kerry North–West Limerick	2011	3	plus 3
Kerry South	1937	3	none
Kildare North	1997	4	none
Kildare South	1997	3	none
Laois–Offaly	2007	5	none
Limerick	2011	3	plus 3
Limerick City	2011	4	plus 4
Longford–Westmeath	2007	4	none
Louth	1923	5	+1
Mayo	1997	5	none
Meath East	2007	3	none
Meath West	2007	3	none
Roscommon–South Leitrim	2007	3	none
Sligo–North Leitrim	2007	3	none
Tipperary North	1948	3	none
Tipperary South	1948	3	none
Waterford	1923	4	none
Wexford	1921	5	none
Wicklow	1923	5	none

=== Summary of changes ===
This table summarises changes in representation. It does not address revisions to the boundaries of constituencies.

Constituency	Created	Seats	Change
Dublin West	1981	4	+1 seat
Dún Laoghaire	1977	4	−1 seat
Kerry North	1937	3	abolished
Kerry North–West Limerick	2011	3	new constituency
Limerick	2011	3	new constituency
Limerick City	2011	4	new constituency
Limerick East	1948	5	abolished
Limerick West	1948	3	abolished
Louth	1923	5	+1 seat

There were further boundary changes to 18 constituencies: Cork East, Cork North-Central, Cork North-West, Donegal North-East, Donegal South-West, Dublin North, Dublin North-Central, Dublin North-East, Dublin South, Kerry South, Kildare North, Kildare South, Laois–Offaly, Meath East, Meath West, Roscommon–South Leitrim, Sligo–North Leitrim and Tipperary North.

== European Parliament constituencies ==
The constituencies below replaced the constituencies which were in operation at the 2004 European Parliament election, with a reduction in the total number of seats from 13 to 12 in light of the increased size of the European Parliament on the accession of Bulgaria and Romania to the European Union in 2007.

They were in turn replaced by the European Parliament Elections (Amendment) Act 2014, with a reduced number of seats to 11 for the 2014 European Parliament election, following the accession of Croatia in 2013.

Constituency	Seats	Change	Area
Dublin	3	−1	The counties of Dún Laoghaire–Rathdown, Fingal and South Dublin; and the city of Dublin.
East	3	none	The counties of Carlow, Kildare, Kilkenny, Laois, Louth, Meath, Offaly, Wexford and Wicklow.
North-West	3	none	The counties of: Cavan, Clare, Donegal, Galway, Leitrim, Longford, Mayo, Monaghan, Roscommon, Sligo and Westmeath; and the city of Galway.
South	3	none	The counties of: County Cork, Kerry, Limerick, North Tipperary, South Tipperary and Waterford; and the cities of Cork, Limerick and Waterford.
