= Michael Fitzmaurice (politician) =

Irish politician (born 1969)

Michael Fitzmaurice TD
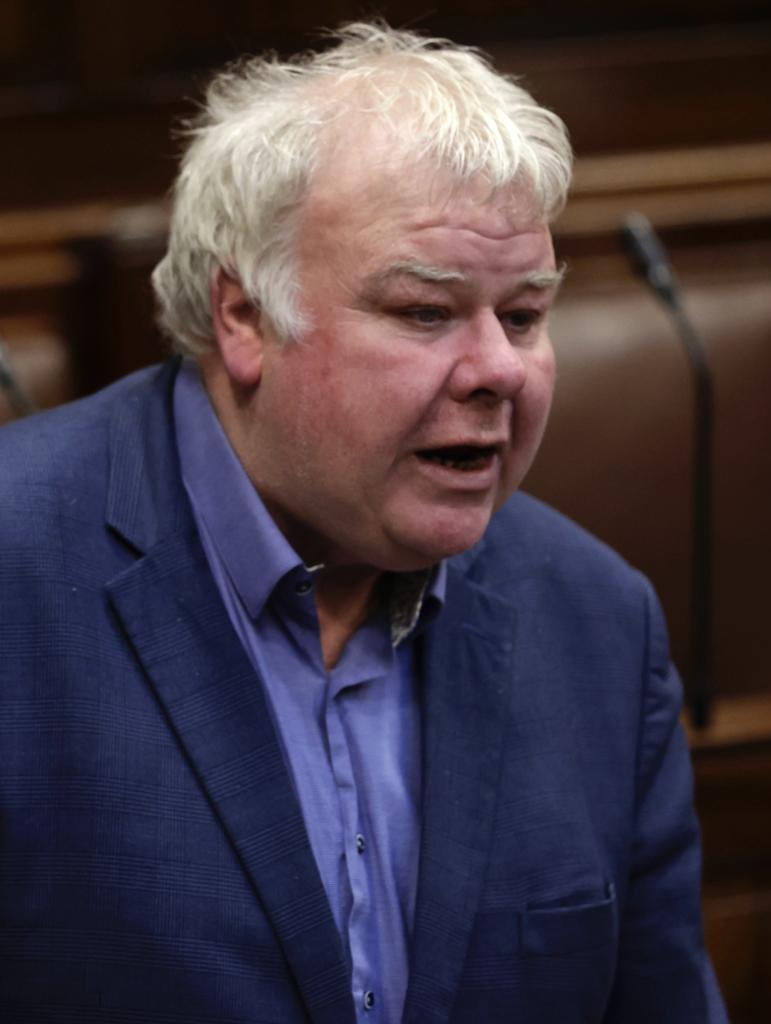
- Fitzmaurice in 2024

Teachta Dála
- Incumbent
- Assumed office February 2016
- Constituency: Roscommon–Galway
- In office October 2014 – February 2016
- Constituency: Roscommon–South Leitrim

Personal details
- Born: 18 September 1969 (age 56) Glinsk, County Galway, Ireland
- Party: Independent Ireland (since 2024)
- Other political affiliations: Independent (until 2024)
- Spouse: Maria Fitzmaurice (m. 2001)
- Children: 3
- Website: michaelfitzmaurice.ie

Michael Fitzmaurice (born 18 September 1969) is an Irish politician from the Independent Ireland party who has been a Teachta Dála (TD) for the Roscommon–Galway constituency since the 2016 general election, and from 2014 to 2016 for the Roscommon–South Leitrim constituency.

Before becoming a politician, Fitzmaurice used to run an agricultural and turf contracting business. He is the chair of the Turf Cutters and Contractors Association.

== Political career ==
Fitzmaurice was elected to Galway County Council for the Tuam local electoral area following the local elections held in May 2014. He entered national politics after winning a by-election caused by the election of Luke 'Ming' Flanagan to the European Parliament. He was endorsed by Flanagan.

He was a founding member of the Independent Alliance, which was formed in 2015. On 18 May 2016, Fitzmaurice, was the only Independent Alliance TD to vote against Enda Kenny as Taoiseach. He later announced that day he was leaving the group and would not join the government.

In February 2024, he joined Independent Ireland, a party founded the previous year by Michael Collins.

At the 2024 general election, Fitzmaurice was re-elected to the Dáil.

== Political views ==
Fitzmaurice is in favour of cutting turf. Turbary rights have been affected by the Habitats Directive, which has resulted in the protection of some raised bogs in Ireland since the 1990s. As at the end of 2018 protection of some bogs as Special Areas of Conservation remains in force, but Fitzmaurice and other politicians have succeeded in removing protection from some bogs designated as Natural Heritage Areas under the Wildlife (Amendment) Act 2000.

Fitzmaurice is a critic of environmental vegetarianism. Defending Irish livestock farmers, he criticised the former President Mary Robinson for advocating reduced meat and dairy consumption so that people have a lower carbon footprint. Along with several other TDs, he later criticised Taoiseach Leo Varadkar for comments about trying to reduce his consumption of meat.

Dáil	Election	Deputy (Party)	Deputy (Party)	Deputy (Party)
30th	2007	Michael Finneran (FF)	Frank Feighan (FG)	Denis Naughten (FG)
31st	2011	Luke 'Ming' Flanagan (Ind.)	Frank Feighan (FG)	Denis Naughten (FG)
31st	2014 by-election	Michael Fitzmaurice (Ind.)	Frank Feighan (FG)	Denis Naughten (FG)
32nd	2016	Constituency abolished. See Roscommon–Galway and Sligo–Leitrim		

Dáil	Election	Deputy (Party)	Deputy (Party)	Deputy (Party)
32nd	2016	Eugene Murphy (FF)	Denis Naughten (Ind.)	Michael Fitzmaurice (Ind.)
33rd	2020	Claire Kerrane (SF)	Denis Naughten (Ind.)	Michael Fitzmaurice (Ind.)
34th	2024	Claire Kerrane (SF)	Martin Daly (FF)	Michael Fitzmaurice (II)
