= John Kelly (Roscommon politician) =

Irish former politician (born 1960)

Senator
- In office 25 May 2011 – 8 June 2016
- Constituency: Administrative Panel

Personal details
- Born: 2 February 1960 (age 66) Ballintober, County Roscommon, Ireland
- Party: Labour Party

John Kelly (born 2 February 1960) is an Irish former Labour Party politician who has served as a Senator for the Administrative Panel from 2011 to 2016.

He was previously a member of Roscommon County Council, having been elected in 2004 as an independent candidate for the Ballaghaderreen local electoral area. He stood as an independent for the Roscommon–South Leitrim constituency at the 2007 general election but was not elected. He was re-elected as an independent to Roscommon County Council in 2009, this time for the Castlerea local electoral area.

He joined the Labour Party in February 2010 and was the party candidate for Roscommon–South Leitrim at the 2011 general election but was not elected. He was the Labour Party Seanad spokesperson on Arts, Heritage, Gaeltacht Affairs, Training and Skills.

Following County Roscommon border disputes in 2016, Kelly did not seek re-election.
