= Martin Kenny =

Irish politician (born 1971)

Martin Kenny TD
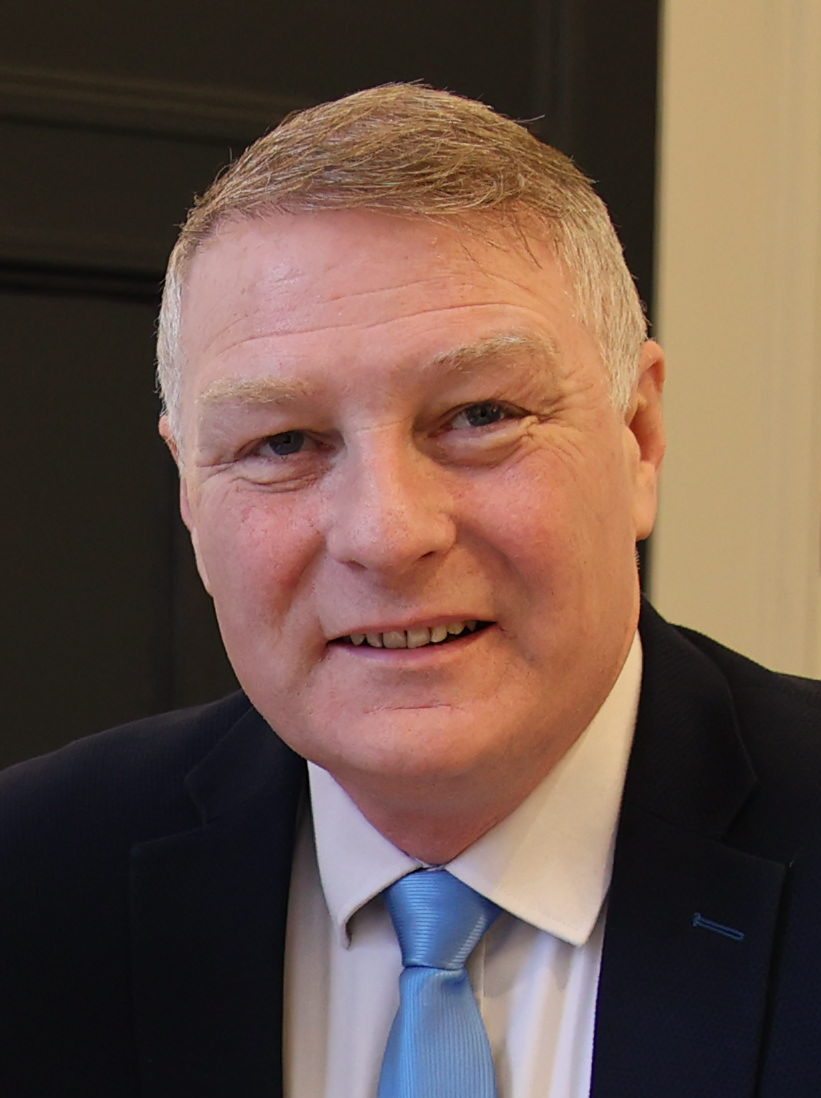
- Kenny in 2024

Teachta Dála
- Incumbent
- Assumed office February 2016
- Constituency: Sligo–Leitrim

Personal details
- Born: 1 October 1971 (age 54) Sligo, Ireland
- Party: Sinn Féin
- Spouse: Helen Kenny
- Children: 4
- Education: Institute of Technology, Sligo

Martin Kenny (born 1 October 1971) is an Irish Sinn Féin politician who has been a Teachta Dála (TD) for the Sligo–Leitrim constituency since the 2016 general election.

== Career ==
Prior to entering politics, Kenny worked in horticulture, growing mushrooms and providing advice to other farmers. He later moved into community work.

Kenny became a member of Leitrim County Council in 2001, when he was co-opted to replace Liam McGirl, the son of former Sinn Féin TD John Joe McGirl. He previously served on Sinn Féin's ard comhairle. Kenny sought the nomination to be Sinn Féin's candidate in the 2014 European Parliament election in Ireland in the North-West constituency, but Matt Carthy was selected.

He was Sinn Féin's candidate in the 2014 Roscommon–South Leitrim by-election, in which he received 5,906 votes (17.7%) and was eliminated on the fifth count. He ran in the new Sligo–Leitrim constituency in the 2016 general election and was elected, with 6,356 votes (10.2%).

In May 2016, Kenny alleged a number of serious instances of misconduct within the Garda Síochána. The main allegations included that gardaí were engaging informants who were active criminals, outside the Garda Covert Human Intelligence Sources programme. He also mentioned a number of instances including "robberies allegedly carried out by informants under the direction of gardaí", cases of entrapment made at the behest of Garda handlers, and an instance where "senior gardaí did not inform other members of the force of plans by a criminal gang to carry out attacks at the homes of gardaí".

He also stated that two Gardaí had brought this to the attention of both Martin Callinan (former Commissioner of the Garda Síochána) and the former Minister of Justice, Alan Shatter, but their concerns were ignored.

Kenny was re-elected in 2020, topping the poll with 15,035 votes (24.8%) and being elected on the first count.

At the 2024 general election, Kenny was re-elected to the Dáil.

=== Harassment and attacks ===
In October 2019, Kenny said he had received death threats after he spoke out in Dáil Éireann against far-right elements in Irish society using anti-immigrant rhetoric. Kenny's remarks were spurred by the aftermath of the 2019 Grays incident, and recent protests against the building of a direct provision centre in his own constituency in County Leitrim as well other protests in Ireland against the construction of direct provision centres. On 28 October 2019, Kenny's car was set ablaze outside his family home. In an interview with Ocean FM he described the arson attack as "traumatic" and feared that he was facing the same fate as Kevin Lunney.

In October 2021, a threat of gun violence was made to Kenny's office. In October 2022, a man was charged with causing criminal damage to the gates of Kenny's home.

== Personal life ==
Kenny is married to Helen, and the couple have four adult children.

Dáil	Election	Deputy (Party)	Deputy (Party)	Deputy (Party)	Deputy (Party)	Deputy (Party)
13th	1948	Eugene Gilbride (FF)	Stephen Flynn (FF)	Bernard Maguire (Ind.)	Mary Reynolds (FG)	Joseph Roddy (FG)
14th	1951	Eugene Gilbride (FF)	Stephen Flynn (FF)	Patrick Rogers (FG)	Mary Reynolds (FG)	Joseph Roddy (FG)
15th	1954	Eugene Gilbride (FF)	Stephen Flynn (FF)	Bernard Maguire (Ind.)	Mary Reynolds (FG)	Joseph Roddy (FG)
16th	1957	Eugene Gilbride (FF)	Stephen Flynn (FF)	John Joe McGirl (SF)	Mary Reynolds (FG)	Patrick Rogers (FG)
16th	1961 by-election	Eugene Gilbride (FF)	Joseph McLoughlin (FG)	John Joe McGirl (SF)	Mary Reynolds (FG)	Patrick Rogers (FG)
17th	1961	Eugene Gilbride (FF)	Joseph McLoughlin (FG)	James Gallagher (FF)	Eugene Gilhawley (FG)	4 seats 1961–1969
18th	1965	Eugene Gilbride (FF)	Joseph McLoughlin (FG)	James Gallagher (FF)	Eugene Gilhawley (FG)	4 seats 1961–1969
19th	1969	Ray MacSharry (FF)	Joseph McLoughlin (FG)	James Gallagher (FF)	3 seats 1969–1981	
20th	1973	Ray MacSharry (FF)	Joseph McLoughlin (FG)	Eugene Gilhawley (FG)	3 seats 1969–1981	
21st	1977	Ray MacSharry (FF)	James Gallagher (FF)	Eugene Gilhawley (FG)	3 seats 1969–1981	
22nd	1981	Ray MacSharry (FF)	John Ellis (FF)	Joe McCartin (FG)	Ted Nealon (FG)	4 seats 1981–2007
23rd	1982 (Feb)	Ray MacSharry (FF)	John Ellis (FF)	Matt Brennan (FF)	Ted Nealon (FG)	4 seats 1981–2007
24th	1982 (Nov)	Ray MacSharry (FF)	Joe McCartin (FG)	Matt Brennan (FF)	Ted Nealon (FG)	4 seats 1981–2007
25th	1987	Ray MacSharry (FF)	John Ellis (FF)	Matt Brennan (FF)	Ted Nealon (FG)	4 seats 1981–2007
26th	1989	Gerry Reynolds (FG)	John Ellis (FF)	Matt Brennan (FF)	Ted Nealon (FG)	4 seats 1981–2007
27th	1992	Declan Bree (Lab)	John Ellis (FF)	Matt Brennan (FF)	Ted Nealon (FG)	4 seats 1981–2007
28th	1997	Gerry Reynolds (FG)	John Ellis (FF)	Matt Brennan (FF)	John Perry (FG)	4 seats 1981–2007
29th	2002	Marian Harkin (Ind.)	John Ellis (FF)	Jimmy Devins (FF)	John Perry (FG)	4 seats 1981–2007
30th	2007	Constituency abolished. See Sligo–North Leitrim and Roscommon–South Leitrim				

Dáil	Election	Deputy (Party)	Deputy (Party)	Deputy (Party)	Deputy (Party)
32nd	2016	Martin Kenny (SF)	Marc MacSharry (FF)	Eamon Scanlon (FF)	Tony McLoughlin (FG)
33rd	2020	Martin Kenny (SF)	Marc MacSharry (FF)	Marian Harkin (Ind.)	Frank Feighan (FG)
34th	2024	Martin Kenny (SF)	Eamon Scanlon (FF)	Marian Harkin (Ind.)	Frank Feighan (FG)
