= Sligo–Leitrim =

Dáil constituency (1948–2007, 2016–present)

- Dáil constituency
- Location of Sligo–Leitrim within Ireland
- Interactive map of constituency boundaries since the 2024 general election
- Major settlements: Ballyshannon; Boyle; Carrick-on-Shannon; Sligo

Current constituency
- Created: 2016
- Seats: 4
- TDs: Frank Feighan (FG); Marian Harkin (Ind); Martin Kenny (SF); Eamon Scanlon (FF)
- Local government areas: County Donegal; County Leitrim; County Sligo
- Created from: Roscommon–South Leitrim; Sligo–North Leitrim
- EP constituency: Midlands–North-West

Sligo–Leitrim
- Former Dáil constituency

Former constituency
- Created: 1948
- Abolished: 2007
- Seats: 5 (1948–1961); 4 (1961–1969); 3 (1969–1981); 4 (1981–2007)
- Local government areas: County Sligo; County Leitrim
- Created from: Leitrim; Sligo
- Replaced by: Roscommon–South Leitrim; Sligo–North Leitrim

Sligo–Leitrim is a parliamentary constituency that has been represented in Dáil Éireann, the lower house of the Irish parliament or Oireachtas, from the 2016 general election. The constituency elects four deputies (Teachtaí Dála, commonly known as TDs) on the system of proportional representation by means of the single transferable vote (PR-STV). Another constituency of the same name existed from 1948 to 2007.

== History and boundaries ==
=== 1948–2007 ===
The Sligo–Leitrim constituency was created under the Electoral (Amendment) Act 1947, and first used at the 1948 general election. It replaced the two previous constituencies of Sligo and Leitrim, which had been created at the 1937 general election to replace the 1923–1937 Leitrim–Sligo constituency.

The constituency was abolished at the 2007 general election, and replaced by two new constituencies: Roscommon–South Leitrim and Sligo–North Leitrim.

=== 2016 onwards ===
The constituency was re-created for the 2016 general election. The change was implemented by the Electoral (Amendment) (Dáil Constituencies) Act 2013, following a recommendation of the Constituency Commission from its 2012 report. It replaced the constituencies of Roscommon–South Leitrim and Sligo–North Leitrim, and comprises all of County Sligo; all of County Leitrim; nine electoral divisions of southern County Donegal, and thirty-six electoral divisions of western County Cavan.

This change proved controversial, and created an unusual cross-province constituency, incorporating all or parts of four counties. Some Cavan and Donegal voters felt unrepresented. One man shared a picture online of his spoiled ballot in the 2016 election, which read "I LIVE IN CAVAN!" Local newspaper The Anglo-Celt reported that several people had similarly spoiled their ballots, using the column of boxes to spell out the same message.

At the 2020 general election, the electoral divisions in County Cavan were transferred to the Cavan–Monaghan constituency, and parts of County Roscommon were added to Sligo–Leitrim instead.

In the Constituency Review Report 2023, the Electoral Commission recommended that the electoral divisions of Roscommon in the constituency should be transferred to the Roscommon–Galway constituency, while keeping the nine electoral divisions of southern Donegal.

The Electoral (Amendment) Act 2023 defines the constituency as:

"The county of Sligo;

and the county of Leitrim;
and in the county of Donegal, the electoral divisions of:

Ballintra, Ballyshannon Rural, Ballyshannon Urban, Bundoran Rural, Carrickboy, Cavangarden, Cliff, in the former Rural District of Ballyshannon;
Ballintra in the former Rural District of Donegal;
and Bundoran Urban."

Changes to the Sligo–Leitrim constituency
Years	TDs	Boundaries	Notes
1923–1937	7	The full territory of both counties.	Named Leitrim–Sligo
1937–1948	—	Constituency abolished	Divided into Leitrim (3 seats) and Sligo (3 seats)
1948–1961	5	The full territory of both counties.	Constituency recreated, now called Sligo–Leitrim
1961–1969	4	All of County Sligo, and all of County Leitrim except for those areas in the constituency of Roscommon.	Adjustments to maintain voter-to-seat ratio at near national average. Most of the Carrick-on-Shannon and Mohill areas now in the Roscommon constituency.
1969–1977	3	All of County Sligo; and all of Leitrim, except the parts in the constituencies of Donegal–Leitrim and Roscommon–Leitrim.	Large parts of County Leitrim moved to the two new neighbouring constituencies
1977–1981	3	All of County Sligo; in County Donegal, all of the Bundoran area and part of Ballyshannon; in County Leitrim, parts of the Kinlough and Manorhamilton districts.	Major revision as part of the "Tullymander". Constituency is now effectively Sligo – Southmost Donegal and the small area of North Leitrim which was in the old Donegal–Leitrim constituency
1981–2007	4	The full territory of both counties.	District electoral divisions in County Leitrim transferred from Roscommon–Leitrim; district electoral divisions in County Donegal transferred to Donegal South-West
2007–2016	—	Constituency abolished.	Divided into Sligo–North Leitrim (3 seats) and Roscommon–South Leitrim (3 seats)
2016–2020	4	All of County Sligo; all of County Leitrim; in County Donegal, the Bundoran and Ballyshannon areas; western parts of County Cavan.	Constituency recreated, with electoral divisions transferred from Cavan–Monaghan and Donegal South-West
2020–	4	All of County Sligo; all of County Leitrim; in County Donegal, the Bundoran and Ballyshannon areas; northern parts of County Roscommon.	Electoral divisions in County Cavan transferred to Cavan–Monaghan; electoral divisions in County Roscommon transferred from Roscommon–Galway

== TDs ==
=== TDs 1948–2007 ===
Teachtaí Dála (TDs) for Sligo–Leitrim 1948–2007
Key to parties: FF = Fianna Fáil; FG = Fine Gael; Ind. = Independent; Lab = Labour; SF = Sinn Féin
Dáil	Election	Deputy (Party)	Deputy (Party)	Deputy (Party)	Deputy (Party)	Deputy (Party)
13th	1948	Eugene Gilbride (FF)	Stephen Flynn (FF)	Bernard Maguire (Ind.)	Mary Reynolds (FG)	Joseph Roddy (FG)
14th	1951	Eugene Gilbride (FF)	Stephen Flynn (FF)	Patrick Rogers (FG)	Mary Reynolds (FG)	Joseph Roddy (FG)
15th	1954	Eugene Gilbride (FF)	Stephen Flynn (FF)	Bernard Maguire (Ind.)	Mary Reynolds (FG)	Joseph Roddy (FG)
16th	1957	Eugene Gilbride (FF)	Stephen Flynn (FF)	John Joe McGirl (SF)	Mary Reynolds (FG)	Patrick Rogers (FG)
16th	1961 by-election	Eugene Gilbride (FF)	Joseph McLoughlin (FG)	John Joe McGirl (SF)	Mary Reynolds (FG)	Patrick Rogers (FG)
17th	1961	Eugene Gilbride (FF)	Joseph McLoughlin (FG)	James Gallagher (FF)	Eugene Gilhawley (FG)	4 seats 1961–1969
18th	1965	Eugene Gilbride (FF)	Joseph McLoughlin (FG)	James Gallagher (FF)	Eugene Gilhawley (FG)	4 seats 1961–1969
19th	1969	Ray MacSharry (FF)	Joseph McLoughlin (FG)	James Gallagher (FF)	3 seats 1969–1981	
20th	1973	Ray MacSharry (FF)	Joseph McLoughlin (FG)	Eugene Gilhawley (FG)	3 seats 1969–1981	
21st	1977	Ray MacSharry (FF)	James Gallagher (FF)	Eugene Gilhawley (FG)	3 seats 1969–1981	
22nd	1981	Ray MacSharry (FF)	John Ellis (FF)	Joe McCartin (FG)	Ted Nealon (FG)	4 seats 1981–2007
23rd	1982 (Feb)	Ray MacSharry (FF)	John Ellis (FF)	Matt Brennan (FF)	Ted Nealon (FG)	4 seats 1981–2007
24th	1982 (Nov)	Ray MacSharry (FF)	Joe McCartin (FG)	Matt Brennan (FF)	Ted Nealon (FG)	4 seats 1981–2007
25th	1987	Ray MacSharry (FF)	John Ellis (FF)	Matt Brennan (FF)	Ted Nealon (FG)	4 seats 1981–2007
26th	1989	Gerry Reynolds (FG)	John Ellis (FF)	Matt Brennan (FF)	Ted Nealon (FG)	4 seats 1981–2007
27th	1992	Declan Bree (Lab)	John Ellis (FF)	Matt Brennan (FF)	Ted Nealon (FG)	4 seats 1981–2007
28th	1997	Gerry Reynolds (FG)	John Ellis (FF)	Matt Brennan (FF)	John Perry (FG)	4 seats 1981–2007
29th	2002	Marian Harkin (Ind.)	John Ellis (FF)	Jimmy Devins (FF)	John Perry (FG)	4 seats 1981–2007
30th	2007	Constituency abolished. See Sligo–North Leitrim and Roscommon–South Leitrim				

Note: The columns in this table are used only for presentational purposes, and no significance should be attached to the order of columns. For details of the order in which seats were won at each election, see the detailed results of that election.

=== TDs since 2016 ===
Teachtaí Dála (TDs) for Sligo–Leitrim 2016–
Key to parties: FF = Fianna Fáil; FG = Fine Gael; Ind. = Independent; SF = Sinn Féin
Dáil	Election	Deputy (Party)	Deputy (Party)	Deputy (Party)	Deputy (Party)
32nd	2016	Martin Kenny (SF)	Marc MacSharry (FF)	Eamon Scanlon (FF)	Tony McLoughlin (FG)
33rd	2020	Martin Kenny (SF)	Marc MacSharry (FF)	Marian Harkin (Ind.)	Frank Feighan (FG)
34th	2024	Martin Kenny (SF)	Eamon Scanlon (FF)	Marian Harkin (Ind.)	Frank Feighan (FG)

Note: The columns in this table are used only for presentational purposes, and no significance should be attached to the order of columns. For details of the order in which seats were won at each election, see the detailed results of that election.

== Elections ==
*: Outgoing TD

=== 2024 general election ===
2024 general election: Sligo–Leitrim
Party	Candidate	FPv%	Count												
Party	Candidate	FPv%	1	2	3	4	5	6	7	8	9	10	11	12	13
Fine Gael	Frank Feighan	15.8	8,980	9,004	9,090	9,103	9,213	9,278	9,317	9,743	10,216	11,064	12,241		
Sinn Féin	Martin Kenny	13.6	7,764	7,794	7,839	7,867	8,056	8,173	8,431	8,717	8,927	9,947	10,218	15,433	
Independent Ireland	Michael Clarke	10.5	5,979	6,033	6,039	6,213	6,330	6,697	6,785	6,879	7,297	7,573	7,969	8,318	9,287
Fianna Fáil	Eamon Scanlon	10.4	5,913	5,926	5,942	5,952	5,965	6,027	6,059	6,137	6,335	7,312	9,740	9,967	10,285
Sinn Féin	Chris MacManus	9.1	5,173	5,200	5,225	5,259	5,276	5,387	6,042	6,369	6,647	6,698	6,932		
Fianna Fáil	Edel McSharry	7.8	4,466	4,486	4,521	4,531	4,560	4,602	4,673	4,948	5,390	6,062			
Independent	Marian Harkin	7.6	4,347	4,378	4,457	4,524	4,678	4,950	5,130	5,688	6,791	7,145	8,306	8,829	10,168
Fianna Fáil	Paddy O'Rourke	7.1	4,066	4,076	4,096	4,101	4,272	4,310	4,329	4,360	4,406				
Independent	Marie Casserly	4.3	2,419	2,494	2,532	2,589	2,631	2,726	2,894	3,480					
Labour	Nessa Cosgrove	3.7	2,086	2,149	2,470	2,481	2,487	2,527	2,846						
PBP–Solidarity	Gino O'Boyle (Note: O'Boyle is a member of People Before Profit.)	2.9	1,657	1,722	1,799	1,845	1,862	1,954							
Aontú	Graham Monaghan	2.0	1,112	1,126	1,142	1,347	1,425								
Independent	Des Guckian	1.6	887	909	918	991									
Irish Freedom	Michael Kelly	1.4	770	809	810										
Green	Bláithín Gallagher	1.3	725	782											
Party for Animal Welfare	Molly Candon	0.7	423												
Independent Ireland	Caroline Corcoran	0.1	69												
Independent	Diarmuid MacConville	0.1	64												
Electorate: 94,040 Valid: 56,900 Spoilt: 416 Quota: 11,381 Turnout: 60.9%

=== 2020 general election ===
2020 general election: Sligo–Leitrim
Party	Candidate	FPv%	Count														
Party	Candidate	FPv%	1	2	3	4	5	6	7	8	9	10	11	12	13	14	15
Sinn Féin	Martin Kenny	24.8	15,035														
Fianna Fáil	Marc MacSharry	11.5	7,004	7,182	7,191	7,238	7,265	7,403	7,483	7,602	7,733	7,917	8,055	9,146	9,300	9,891	10,734
Independent	Marian Harkin	11.5	6,972	7,464	7,481	7,524	7,570	7,691	7,941	8,135	8,502	8,962	9,679	10,123	10,834	12,995	
Fianna Fáil	Eamon Scanlon	10.3	6,246	6,355	6,357	6,370	6,387	6,434	6,461	6,859	7,186	7,285	7,371	8,093	8,193	8,409	9,316
Fine Gael	Frank Feighan	8.8	5,338	5,457	5,464	5,471	5,505	5,536	5,637	5,764	5,823	6,065	6,324	6,851	6,952	7,231	10,690
Fine Gael	Thomas Walsh	7.8	4,760	4,809	4,811	4,818	4,826	4,856	4,916	5,218	5,342	5,412	5,587	5,649	5,733	5,975	
Fianna Fáil	Shane Ellis	4.5	2,753	2,926	2,929	2,941	2,968	2,985	3,006	3,011	3,065	3,328	3,398				
Inds. 4 Change	Declan Bree	3.7	2,236	2,614	2,619	2,640	2,677	2,701	2,886	2,951	3,104	3,216	3,586	3,661	5,292		
Green	Bláithin Gallagher	3.0	1,791	1,957	1,967	1,995	2,019	2,052	2,403	2,423	2,475	2,575					
Solidarity–PBP	Gino O'Boyle (Note: O'Boyle was a member of People Before Profit.)	2.9	1,746	2,383	2,388	2,412	2,456	2,487	2,626	2,668	2,876	2,976	3,478	3,515			
Independent	John Perry	2.3	1,367	1,406	1,406	1,413	1,428	1,453	1,464								
Independent	James Conway	2.2	1,354	1,526	1,535	1,548	1,607	1,635	1,655	1,767							
Independent	Sean Wynne	2.2	1,310	1,457	1,472	1,517	1,598	1,820	1,836	1,864	1,985						
Labour	Nessa Cosgrove	1.9	1,178	1,262	1,264	1,272	1,282	1,305									
Independent	Bernie O'Hara	1.1	650	699	712	799	859										
National Party	Paul McWeeney	0.7	451	499	512	553											
Aontú	Anne McCloskey	0.6	368	408	424												
Renua	Oisín O'Dwyer	0.1	75	86													
Independent	Mary O'Donnell	0.1	46	55													
Electorate: 97,170 Valid: 60,680 Spoilt: 489 Quota: 12,137 Turnout: 61,169 (63.0%)

=== 2016 general election ===
2016 general election: Sligo–Leitrim
Party	Candidate	FPv%	Count														
Party	Candidate	FPv%	1	2	3	4	5	6	7	8	9	10	11	12	13	14	15
Fianna Fáil	Marc MacSharry	14.2	8,856	8,874	8,893	9,036	9,122	9,447	9,549	9,705	10,322	10,672	11,520	13,227			
Fine Gael	Gerry Reynolds	10.7	6,672	6,702	6,742	6,797	6,944	7,027	7,054	7,314	7,532	8,715	8,921	10,092	10,177	10,316	10,417
Sinn Féin	Martin Kenny	10.2	6,356	6,419	6,439	6,473	6,687	6,781	6,988	7,028	7,270	7,305	7,971	9,294	14,066		
Fine Gael	Tony McLoughlin	9.9	6,172	6,204	6,237	6,338	6,371	6,440	6,485	7,013	7,628	9,465	10,055	10,167	10,529	10,910	10,931
Fianna Fáil	Eamon Scanlon	9.4	5,874	5,899	5,907	5,961	5,994	6,126	6,179	6,267	6,522	7,553	7,822	9,145	9,554	10,185	10,822
Fianna Fáil	Paddy O'Rourke	8.7	5,447	5,474	5,486	5,511	5,658	5,799	5,819	5,863	5,949	6,001	6,083				
Sinn Féin	Chris MacManus	7.6	4,747	4,786	4,809	4,837	4,865	4,909	5,194	5,257	5,547	5,637	7,045	7,093			
Fine Gael	John Perry	7.1	4,403	4,413	4,431	4,466	4,487	4,533	4,566	4,773	4,935						
Independent	Declan Bree	5.2	3,250	3,282	3,347	3,399	3,454	3,547	4,165	4,402	5,361	5,512					
Independent	Marie Casserly	4.4	2,726	2,763	2,823	2,945	3,067	3,254	3,697	4,138							
Labour	Susan O'Keeffe	2.9	1,829	1,843	1,986	2,036	2,060	2,096	2,192								
AAA–PBP	Nigel Gallagher	2.8	1,768	1,803	1,890	1,950	2,014	2,074									
Independent	Bernie O'Hara	1.9	1,206	1,242	1,265	1,344	1,470										
Independent	Des Guckian	1.7	1,060	1,098	1,118	1,154											
Renua	Finbarr Filan	1.4	881	887	913												
Green	Leslie O'Hora	1.0	603	619													
Independent	Eamon Murray	0.6	356														
Independent	Bernard Sweeney	0.2	129														
Electorate: 95,911 Valid: 62,335 (65.0%) Spoilt: 560 (0.9%) Quota: 12,468 Turnout: 62,895 (65.6%)

=== 2002 general election ===
2002 general election: Sligo–Leitrim
Party	Candidate	FPv%	Count						
Party	Candidate	FPv%	1	2	3	4	5	6	7
Independent	Marian Harkin	17.6	8,610	8,796	9,624	11,397			
Fine Gael	John Perry	14.1	6,897	6,983	7,291	7,699	7,923	10,439	
Fianna Fáil	John Ellis	13.1	6,434	6,465	6,506	7,282	7,503	8,499	9,271
Fianna Fáil	Eamon Scanlon	13.0	6,345	6,381	6,463	6,856	6,981		
Fianna Fáil	Jimmy Devins	12.9	6,307	6,427	6,824	7,591	7,894	10,621	
Fine Gael	Gerry Reynolds	12.6	6,162	6,236	6,438	6,939	7,151	7,303	7,357
Sinn Féin	Seán MacManus	10.2	5,001	5,100	5,616				
Labour	Declan Bree	5.0	2,429	2,530					
Independent	Andy McSharry	0.6	303						
Independent	Martin Forde	0.4	203						
Christian Solidarity	John Lacken	0.3	166						
Independent	John McCrea	0.2	114						
Electorate: 70,460 Valid: 48,971 Spoilt: 523 (1.1%) Quota: 9,795 Turnout: 49,494 (70.2%)

=== 1997 general election ===
1997 general election: Sligo–Leitrim
Party	Candidate	FPv%	Count					
Party	Candidate	FPv%	1	2	3	4	5	6
Fianna Fáil	John Ellis	15.6	7,051	7,295	7,921	7,989	9,071	
Fine Gael	Gerry Reynolds	14.9	6,743	6,980	7,227	8,164	8,465	8,688
Fianna Fáil	Matt Brennan	14.3	6,461	6,763	7,053	7,332	10,513	
Fine Gael	John Perry	12.8	5,786	5,997	6,140	8,038	8,440	8,874
Labour	Declan Bree	10.9	4,905	5,088	6,106	6,714	7,447	7,969
Fianna Fáil	Margaret Gertrude Forde	10.4	4,738	5,305	5,718	6,120		
Fine Gael	Joe Leonard	8.9	4,016	4,233	4,353			
Sinn Féin	Sean MacManus	7.1	3,208	3,356				
Christian Solidarity	John Lacken	3.0	1,359					
Progressive Democrats	Jim Lawlor	1.6	745					
Natural Law	Simeon Gillan	0.3	154					
Electorate: 64,770 Valid: 45,166 Spoilt: 452 (1.0%) Quota: 9,034 Turnout: 45,618 (70.4%)

=== 1992 general election ===
1992 general election: Sligo–Leitrim
Party	Candidate	FPv%	Count					
Party	Candidate	FPv%	1	2	3	4	5	6
Fianna Fáil	John Ellis	17.4	7,430	7,712	7,740	8,460	10,025	
Labour	Declan Bree	17.2	7,328	7,842	8,068	9,107		
Fianna Fáil	Matt Brennan	15.9	6,791	6,868	7,370	10,332		
Fine Gael	Ted Nealon	15.5	6,622	6,678	7,200	7,644	7,810	8,144
Fine Gael	Gerry Reynolds	14.9	6,348	6,456	6,627	6,772	6,826	6,910
Fianna Fáil	Gerry Healy	12.3	5,270	5,362	5,441			
Independent	John McGettrick	3.7	1,560	1,617				
Sinn Féin	Seán MacManus	3.1	1,311					
Ind. Unionist	Patrick Denis Melly	0.2	73					
Electorate: 60,764 Valid: 42,733 Spoilt: 553 (1.3%) Quota: 8,547 Turnout: 43,286 (71.2%)

=== 1989 general election ===
1989 general election: Sligo–Leitrim
Party	Candidate	FPv%	Count					
Party	Candidate	FPv%	1	2	3	4	5	6
Fine Gael	Gerry Reynolds	19.8	8,487	8,927				
Fianna Fáil	Matt Brennan	18.7	7,982	8,052	8,159	8,171	12,110	
Fine Gael	Ted Nealon	16.1	6,881	7,728	7,312	7,593	7,972	8,375
Fianna Fáil	John Ellis	14.7	6,295	6,339	6,666	6,690	7,359	10,030
Fianna Fáil	Hugh Glynn	12.7	5,450	5,555	5,633	5,647		
Independent Socialist	Declan Bree	11.6	4,947	5,136	5,652	5,691	6,182	6,615
Sinn Féin	Seán MacManus	3.5	1,482	1,503				
Progressive Democrats	Hugh Slevin	2.9	1,255					
Electorate: 58,358 Valid: 42,779 Quota: 8,556 Turnout: 73.3%

=== 1987 general election ===
1987 general election: Sligo–Leitrim
Party	Candidate	FPv%	Count						
Party	Candidate	FPv%	1	2	3	4	5	6	7
Fianna Fáil	Ray MacSharry	20.8	9,521						
Fianna Fáil	John Ellis	15.6	7,140	7,198	7,203	7,364	8,461	8,492	8,840
Fianna Fáil	Matt Brennan	15.1	6,913	7,154	7,174	7,404	7,663	8,135	8,854
Fine Gael	Ted Nealon	14.2	6,483	6,512	6,534	7,458	7,561	8,975	10,208
Fine Gael	Joe McCartin	11.1	5,071	5,078	5,090	5,581	5,988	6,854	7,145
Sinn Féin	John Joe McGirl	5.7	2,627	2,634	2,651	2,722			
Fine Gael	Tommy Lavin	5.7	2,606	2,609	2,615	2,877	2,906		
Independent	Declan Bree	5.7	2,584	2,608	2,708	3,023	3,442	3,495	
Progressive Democrats	Frank Dobbs	5.5	2,521	2,530	2,570				
Independent	Noel Gorman	0.5	240	241					
Electorate: 59,740 Valid: 45,706 Quota: 9,142 Turnout: 76.5%

=== November 1982 general election ===
November 1982 general election: Sligo–Leitrim
Party	Candidate	FPv%	Count				
Party	Candidate	FPv%	1	2	3	4	5
Fianna Fáil	John Ellis	18.4	8,552	8,712	8,746	8,753	8,791
Fine Gael	Joe McCartin	17.8	8,242	8,519	10,732		
Fianna Fáil	Matt Brennan	17.6	8,167	8,512	8,968	9,004	9,282
Fianna Fáil	Ray MacSharry	17.0	7,897	8,573	8,703	8,752	8,878
Fine Gael	Ted Nealon	14.4	6,682	7,226	8,888	10,241	
Fine Gael	Tommy Lavin	9.3	4,317	4,558			
Independent	Declan Bree	3.9	1,832				
Labour	James Finan	1.2	562				
Independent	Noel Gorman	0.4	180				
Electorate: 59,268 Valid: 46,431 Quota: 9,287 Turnout: 78.3%

=== February 1982 general election ===
February 1982 general election: Sligo–Leitrim
Party	Candidate	FPv%	Count				
Party	Candidate	FPv%	1	2	3	4	5
Fianna Fáil	Ray MacSharry	20.2	9,214				
Fine Gael	Ted Nealon	19.9	9,082	9,504			
Fianna Fáil	John Ellis	16.8	7,654	7,745	7,807	8,877	8,893
Fianna Fáil	Matt Brennan	16.4	7,500	7,716	8,131	8,589	8,634
Fine Gael	Joe McCartin	13.7	6,261	6,393	7,621	8,290	8,523
Sinn Féin	John Joe McGirl	6.1	2,772	3,092	3,177		
Fine Gael	Joe Cawley	3.9	1,783	1,910			
Independent	Declan Bree	2.3	1,035				
Labour	Séamus Kennelly	0.9	399				
Electorate: 58,464 Valid: 45,700 Quota: 9,141 Turnout: 78.2%

=== 1981 general election ===
1981 general election: Sligo–Leitrim
Party	Candidate	FPv%	Count				
Party	Candidate	FPv%	1	2	3	4	5
Fianna Fáil	Ray MacSharry	22.7	10,818				
Fianna Fáil	John Ellis	14.9	7,121	7,188	7,356	7,519	9,253
Fine Gael	Ted Nealon	13.2	6,292	6,462	6,551	8,948	9,748
Fine Gael	Joe McCartin	12.4	5,927	6,022	6,051	7,655	8,914
Fianna Fáil	Matt Brennan	12.3	5,848	5,979	6,697	6,995	8,161
Anti H-Block	Joe McDonnell	11.8	5,639	6,127	6,236	6,680	
Fine Gael	Tony McLoughlin	10.0	4,749	5,005	5,172		
Independent	Declan Bree	2.0	934				
Labour	Richard Lacy	0.8	361				
Electorate: 58,464 Valid: 47,689 Quota: 9,538 Turnout: 81.6%

=== 1977 general election ===
1977 general election: Sligo–Leitrim
Party	Candidate	FPv%	Count				
Party	Candidate	FPv%	1	2	3	4	5
Fianna Fáil	Ray MacSharry	30.9	10,970				
Fine Gael	Eugene Gilhawley	22.4	7,988	8,106	8,379	8,544	9,024
Fianna Fáil	James Gallagher	17.3	6,152	7,638	7,710	8,005	9,060
Fine Gael	Joseph McLoughlin	16.2	5,786	5,920	6,231	6,457	7,489
Independent	Seán McManus	6.7	2,399	2,614	2,877	3,426	
Independent	Declan Bree	3.6	1,282	1,341	1,505		
Labour	Thomas Higgins	3.0	1,074	1,119			
Electorate: 45,418 Valid: 35,651 Quota: 8,913 Turnout: 78.5%

=== 1973 general election ===
1973 general election: Sligo–Leitrim
Party	Candidate	FPv%	Count			
Party	Candidate	FPv%	1	2	3	4
Fianna Fáil	Ray MacSharry	25.8	7,535			
Fine Gael	Eugene Gilhawley	22.3	6,520	6,533	7,182	7,225
Fine Gael	Joseph McLoughlin	19.7	5,743	5,765	6,973	7,716
Fianna Fáil	Bernard Brennan	16.9	4,922	5,066	5,228	6,666
Fianna Fáil	Joe Mooney	8.0	2,325	2,365	2,421	
Labour	Thomas Higgins	7.4	2,158	2,173		
Electorate: 38,049 Valid: 29,203 Quota: 7,301 Turnout: 76.0%

=== 1969 general election ===
1969 general election: Sligo–Leitrim
Party	Candidate	FPv%	Count						
Party	Candidate	FPv%	1	2	3	4	5	6	7
Fianna Fáil	James Gallagher	20.4	6,124	6,135	6,205	6,340	6,436	7,081	7,213
Fine Gael	Joseph McLoughlin	20.2	6,053	6,211	6,311	6,838	7,293	8,011	
Fine Gael	Eugene Gilhawley	19.5	5,858	5,866	5,977	6,350	6,560	6,608	6,677
Fianna Fáil	Ray MacSharry	18.7	5,616	5,634	5,823	5,985	6,409	7,321	7,432
Fianna Fáil	Joe Mooney	7.6	2,267	2,470	2,510	2,521	2,562		
Fine Gael	John Fallon	4.5	1,332	1,335	1,379				
Labour	Thomas Higgins	4.2	1,251	1,280	1,690	1,812			
Labour	Joan Gallagher	3.2	967	1,018					
Labour	Patrick O'Rourke	1.7	506						
Electorate: 38,198 Valid: 29,974 Quota: 7,494 Turnout: 78.5%

=== 1965 general election ===
1965 general election: Sligo–Leitrim
Party	Candidate	FPv%	Count				
Party	Candidate	FPv%	1	2	3	4	5
Fine Gael	Joseph McLoughlin	19.1	6,379	6,492	7,279		
Fianna Fáil	James Gallagher	18.7	6,250	6,385	6,421	7,735	
Fine Gael	Eugene Gilhawley	18.1	6,052	6,112	6,529	6,703	
Fianna Fáil	Eugene Gilbride	14.3	4,782	4,881	4,969	6,342	7,290
Labour	Daniel Shaw	11.7	3,903	4,180	4,399	4,930	5,020
Fianna Fáil	Harry O'Carroll	11.2	3,736	3,752	3,782		
Fine Gael	Thomas McGoldrick	4.6	1,528	1,629			
Independent	Gerald Foley	2.5	850				
Electorate: 44,276 Valid: 33,480 Quota: 6,697 Turnout: 75.6%

=== 1961 general election ===
1961 general election: Sligo–Leitrim
Party	Candidate	FPv%	Count							
Party	Candidate	FPv%	1	2	3	4	5	6	7	8
Fine Gael	Joseph McLoughlin	18.3	6,240	6,382	7,015					
Fianna Fáil	James Gallagher	14.7	5,032	5,100	5,234	6,002	6,013	6,951		
Fianna Fáil	Eugene Gilbride	13.0	4,429	4,541	4,705	4,923	4,933	5,962	6,063	6,541
Fine Gael	Eugene Gilhawley	12.5	4,268	4,539	4,594	5,383	5,398	5,502	5,504	7,106
Fine Gael	Gerald Foley	8.6	2,949	3,148	3,230	3,536	3,551	3,596	3,599	
Fianna Fáil	Joe Mooney	7.8	2,668	2,676	3,137	3,173	3,257			
Labour	Daniel Shaw	7.6	2,600	2,644	2,974	3,232	3,274	3,624	3,631	4,457
Independent	James Flanagan	7.3	2,512	2,587	2,706					
Sinn Féin	John Joe McGirl	7.3	2,487	2,512						
Clann na Talmhan	Francis Higgins	2.9	1,000							
Electorate: 46,492 Valid: 34,185 Quota: 6,838 Turnout: 73.5%

=== 1961 by-election ===
Fianna Fáil TD Stephen Flynn died on 24 November 1960. A by-election was held to fill the vacancy on 1 March 1961.

1961 by-election: Sligo–Leitrim
Party	Candidate	FPv%	Count
Party	Candidate	FPv%	1
Fine Gael	Joseph McLoughlin	52.0	17,126
Fianna Fáil	Willie Farrell	48.0	15,807
Electorate: 56,714 Valid: 32,933 Quota: 16,467 Turnout: 58.1%

=== 1957 general election ===
1957 general election: Sligo–Leitrim
Party	Candidate	FPv%	Count									
Party	Candidate	FPv%	1	2	3	4	5	6	7	8	9	10
Sinn Féin	John Joe McGirl	15.7	7,007	7,206	7,313	7,795						
Fine Gael	Mary Reynolds	13.4	5,962	6,010	6,167	6,485	6,578	7,802				
Fianna Fáil	Eugene Gilbride	11.9	5,303	5,607	5,711	5,866	5,883	6,112	6,130	9,250		
Fine Gael	Joseph Roddy	9.9	4,429	4,904	5,565	5,586	5,593	5,683	5,795	6,002	6,050	6,142
Fianna Fáil	Michael McDonagh	9.9	4,422	4,486	4,736	4,903	4,912	5,160	5,172			
Fine Gael	Patrick Rogers	9.0	4,001	4,059	5,221	5,235	5,238	5,308	5,331	6,001	6,128	6,236
Independent	Bernard Maguire	8.1	3,601	3,680	3,702	4,114	4,228					
Fianna Fáil	Leo McAlinden	6.5	2,912	2,932	2,952							
Fianna Fáil	Stephen Flynn	6.5	2,879	2,926	3,065	4,349	4,466	6,107	6,309	6,871	8,511	
Fine Gael	Luke Colleran	6.0	2,696	2,732								
Independent	Gerald Foley	3.1	1,392									
Electorate: 60,767 Valid: 44,604 Quota: 7,435 Turnout: 73.4%

=== 1954 general election ===
1954 general election: Sligo–Leitrim
Party	Candidate	FPv%	Count											
Party	Candidate	FPv%	1	2	3	4	5	6	7	8	9	10	11	12
Fine Gael	Joseph Roddy	12.2	5,865	5,878	5,897	6,232	7,151	7,164	8,216					
Fianna Fáil	Eugene Gilbride	11.7	5,633	5,635	5,647	5,721	6,292	6,391	6,735	10,677				
Fine Gael	Mary Reynolds	11.7	5,628	5,869	6,537	7,449	7,582	8,086						
Fine Gael	Patrick Rogers	11.5	5,505	5,518	5,543	5,834	6,003	6,013	6,235	6,691	6,898	7,036	7,085	7,100
Fianna Fáil	Michael Kirrane	10.4	4,968	4,973	4,985	5,019	5,152	5,349	5,457					
Independent	Bernard Maguire	8.7	4,169	4,289	4,460	4,682	4,800	5,347	5,941	6,166	6,175	6,398	7,035	7,111
Fianna Fáil	Stephen Flynn	6.8	3,282	3,292	3,410	3,785	3,853	5,584	5,923	6,355	6,360	8,681		
Fianna Fáil	Leo McAlinden	6.3	3,022	3,091	3,296	3,307	3,329							
Clann na Poblachta	Martin McGowan	5.7	2,742	2,775	2,835	2,956	3,409	3,476						
Independent	Joseph Pilkington	5.6	2,710	2,718	2,735	2,786								
Fine Gael	Thomas Fallon	5.1	2,453	2,470	2,513									
Independent	Joseph Mary Mooney	2.9	1,406	1,432										
Clann na Talmhan	Alphonso Quinn	1.2	586											
Electorate: 62,702 Valid: 47,969 Quota: 7,995 Turnout: 76.5%

=== 1951 general election ===
1951 general election: Sligo–Leitrim
Party	Candidate	FPv%	Count							
Party	Candidate	FPv%	1	2	3	4	5	6	7	8
Fine Gael	Mary Reynolds	15.2	7,357	7,584	8,678					
Fine Gael	Joseph Roddy	12.6	6,087	7,113	7,177	7,309	8,728			
Fine Gael	Patrick Rogers	12.4	5,996	6,202	6,265	6,294	6,619	6,680	6,698	7,324
Fianna Fáil	Eugene Gilbride	11.6	5,629	6,096	6,208	6,218	6,674	6,908	8,161	
Fianna Fáil	Michael McDonagh Jnr	11.2	5,429	5,590	5,721	5,735	5,874	6,013	6,474	6,495
Fianna Fáil	Stephen Flynn	8.6	4,188	4,239	5,297	5,462	6,083	9,813		
Fianna Fáil	Willie Farrell	8.2	3,966	4,016	4,606	4,736	4,870			
Independent	Bernard Maguire	7.5	3,637	3,712						
Clann na Poblachta	Martin McGowan	6.6	3,197	3,802	4,191	4,308				
Labour	Michael Nevin	6.2	2,999							
Electorate: 65,697 Valid: 48,485 Quota: 8,081 Turnout: 73.8%

=== 1948 general election ===
1948 general election: Sligo–Leitrim
Party	Candidate	FPv%	Count												
Party	Candidate	FPv%	1	2	3	4	5	6	7	8	9	10	11	12	13
Fianna Fáil	Eugene Gilbride	11.4	5,688	5,726	5,764	5,780	5,802	6,156	6,203	6,364	6,545	6,581	6,873	10,094	
Fine Gael	Mary Reynolds	10.3	5,141	5,152	5,161	5,309	5,454	5,501	6,075	6,368	6,419	7,551	7,871	7,959	7,967
Fine Gael	Joseph Roddy	10.1	5,054	5,081	5,143	5,154	5,215	5,638	5,715	6,467	6,734	6,776	7,271	7,401	7,442
Fianna Fáil	Stephen Flynn	9.8	4,910	4,926	4,942	4,990	5,174	5,296	5,526	5,597	5,671	5,835	6,131	6,495	7,911
Independent	Bernard Maguire	9.5	4,757	4,774	4,800	4,944	5,064	5,204	5,764	5,870	5,924	6,521	6,979	7,182	7,317
Fianna Fáil	Michael McDonagh Jnr	9.1	4,582	4,600	4,700	4,722	4,734	4,783	4,799	4,850	5,127	5,181	5,248		
Fine Gael	Patrick Rogers	8.6	4,324	4,331	4,445	4,459	4,480	4,531	4,544	4,978	5,690	5,750	5,926	6,524	6,664
Clann na Talmhan	Laurence Harte	4.4	2,227	2,237	2,248	2,368	2,622	2,639	2,688	2,747	3,024				
Independent	Francis W. Higgins	4.2	2,088	2,101	2,119	2,136	2,172	2,235	2,323						
Clann na Poblachta	Robert P. Flanagan	3.9	1,952	1,987	2,383	3,017	3,169	3,492	3,585	3,651	3,829	3,961			
Clann na Talmhan	Francis Gannon	3.7	1,840	1,860	2,030	2,044	2,156	2,334	2,381	2,522					
National Labour Party	James Flynn	3.6	1,785	1,826	1,838	1,857	1,921								
Independent	Michael McGowan	3.5	1,776	1,786	1,799	1,822	1,967	2,003							
Clann na Talmhan	Owen Dolan	2.7	1,338	1,347	1,350	1,371									
Clann na Poblachta	Patrick G. Kiernan	2.4	1,177	1,196	1,329										
Clann na Poblachta	John Leonard	2.3	1,158	1,166											
Ailtirí na hAiséirghe	William Hargadon	0.6	323												
Electorate: 68,912 Valid: 50,120 Quota: 8,354 Turnout: 72.7%

== See also ==
- Dáil constituencies
- Elections in the Republic of Ireland
- Politics of the Republic of Ireland
- List of Dáil by-elections
- List of political parties in the Republic of Ireland
