= Roscommon–South Leitrim =

Dáil constituency (2007–2016)

- Former Dáil constituency
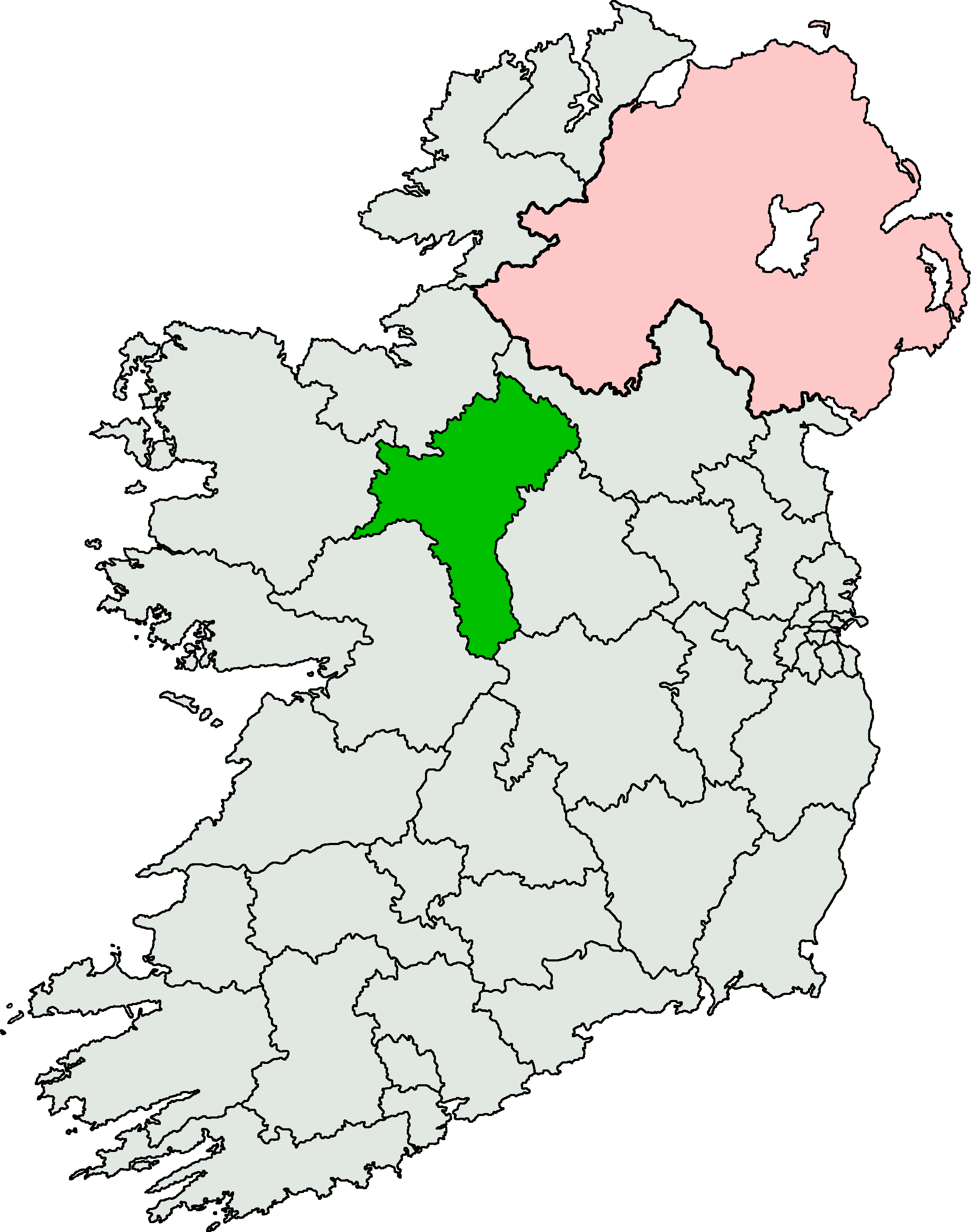
- Location of Roscommon–South Leitrim within Ireland

Former constituency
- Created: 2007
- Abolished: 2016
- Seats: 3
- Local government areas: County Roscommon; County Leitrim
- Created from: Longford–Roscommon; Sligo–Leitrim
- Replaced by: Roscommon–Galway; Sligo–Leitrim

Roscommon–South Leitrim was a parliamentary constituency represented in Dáil Éireann, the lower house of the Irish parliament or Oireachtas, from 2007 to 2016. The constituency elected 3 deputies (Teachtaí Dála, commonly known as TDs). The method of election was proportional representation by means of the single transferable vote (PR-STV).

== History and boundaries ==
The constituency was created for the 2007 general election by the Electoral (Amendment) Act 2005, which gave effect to the 2004 Constituency Commission Report on Dáil Constituencies. It included all of County Roscommon and the southern portion of County Leitrim (the area to the east and south of Lough Allen). This territory was previously represented through the constituencies of Longford–Roscommon and Sligo–Leitrim, both of which were abolished in 2007.

The Electoral (Amendment) Act 2009 defined the constituency as:

"The county of Roscommon;

and, in the county of Leitrim, the electoral divisions of:

Ballinamore, Cloverhill, Corralla, Drumreilly North, Drumreilly South, Garradice, Greaghglass, Killygar, Newtowngore, Oughteragh, in the former Rural District of Ballinamore;

Annaduff, Carrick-on-Shannon, Drumsna, Gortnagullion, Gowel, in the former Rural District of Carrick-on-Shannon No. 1;

Aghavas, Beihy, Breandrum, Bunny Beg, Carrigallen East, Carrigallen West, Cashel, Castlefore, Cattan, Cloone, Corriga, Drumard, Drumdoo, Drumod, Fenagh, Gortermone, Keeldra, Lisgillock, Mohill, Rinn, Riverstown, Roosky, Rowan, in the former Rural District of Mohill."

It was abolished at the 2016 general election and replaced by the Roscommon–Galway and Sligo–Leitrim constituencies.

== TDs ==
Teachtaí Dála (TDs) for Roscommon–South Leitrim 2007–2016
Key to parties: FF = Fianna Fáil; FG = Fine Gael; Ind. = Independent
Dáil	Election	Deputy (Party)	Deputy (Party)	Deputy (Party)
30th	2007	Michael Finneran (FF)	Frank Feighan (FG)	Denis Naughten (FG)
31st	2011	Luke 'Ming' Flanagan (Ind.)	Frank Feighan (FG)	Denis Naughten (FG)
31st	2014 by-election	Michael Fitzmaurice (Ind.)	Frank Feighan (FG)	Denis Naughten (FG)
32nd	2016	Constituency abolished. See Roscommon–Galway and Sligo–Leitrim		

Note: The columns in this table are used only for presentational purposes, and no significance should be attached to the order of columns. For details of the order in which seats were won at each election, see the detailed results of that election.

== Elections ==
*: Outgoing TD

=== 2014 by-election ===
2014 by-election: Roscommon–South Leitrim
Party	Candidate	FPv%	Count						
Party	Candidate	FPv%	1	2	3	4	5	6	7
Fianna Fáil	Ivan Connaughton	22.0	7,334	7,502	7,652	7,846	8,863	10,083	12,050
Independent	Michael Fitzmaurice	18.7	6,220	6,371	6,625	7,075	9,211	11,722	14,881
Sinn Féin	Martin Kenny	17.7	5,906	6,184	6,283	6,447	7,022		
Fine Gael	Maura Hopkins	16.8	5,593	5,742	5,864	6,075	7,312	8,476	
Independent	John McDermott	8.8	2,944	3,018	3,187	3,468			
Labour	John Kelly	6.1	2,037	2,060	2,090	2,144			
Independent	Emmett Corcoran	3.8	1,262	1,305	1,483				
Independent	Tom Crosby	3.1	1,030	1,063					
Independent	Des Guckian	2.7	902						
Independent	Gerry O'Boyle	0.2	82						
Electorate: 64,873 Valid: 33,310 Spoilt: 262 (0.8%) Quota: 16,656 Turnout: 33,572 (51.8%)

=== 2011 general election ===
2011 general election: Roscommon–South Leitrim
Party	Candidate	FPv%	Count					
Party	Candidate	FPv%	1	2	3	4	5	6
Fine Gael	Denis Naughten	19.6	9,320	9,429	10,618	11,349	11,415	12,122
Fine Gael	Frank Feighan	18.9	8,983	9,457	9,902	11,130	11,239	13,266
New Vision	Luke 'Ming' Flanagan (Note: New Vision was an electoral alliance of independent non-party candidates and did not appear on the ballot.)	18.8	8,925	9,251	10,448	12,149		
Sinn Féin	Martin Kenny	9.8	4,637	5,369	5,526	6,042	6,108	
Labour	John Kelly	9.4	4,455	4,617	4,894			
Fianna Fáil	Ivan Connaughton	8.6	4,070	5,379	5,856	6,254	6,285	7,034
Independent	John McDermott	7.9	3,770	3,882				
Fianna Fáil	Gerry Kilrane	6.4	3,033					
Green	Garreth McDaid	0.5	220					
Independent	Seán Kearns	0.2	91					
Electorate: 60,235 Valid: 47,504 Spoilt: 531 (1.1%) Quota: 11,877 Turnout: 48,035 (79.7%)

=== 2007 general election ===
2007 general election: Roscommon–South Leitrim
Party	Candidate	FPv%	Count			
Party	Candidate	FPv%	1	2	3	4
Fianna Fáil	Michael Finneran	21.7	9,982	10,135	10,529	12,017
Fine Gael	Frank Feighan	19.8	9,103	9,507	10,421	12,065
Fine Gael	Denis Naughten	19.4	8,928	9,354	9,670	11,048
Fianna Fáil	John Ellis	17.2	7,915	8,060	9,347	9,650
Independent	John Kelly	9.9	4,539	4,839	5,522	
Sinn Féin	Martin Kenny	8.4	3,876	4,118		
Green	Garreth McDaid	1.8	836			
Labour	Hughie Baxter	1.8	832			
Independent	Noel O'Gara	0.1	66			
Electorate: 62,437 Valid: 46,077 Spoilt: ? Quota: 11,520 Turnout: 73.8%

== 2015 Marriage Equality referendum ==
On 22 May 2015, Roscommon–South Leitrim was the only constituency to vote against the marriage equality referendum, with 51.42% voting No.

== See also ==
- Dáil constituencies
- Politics of the Republic of Ireland
- Historic Dáil constituencies
- Elections in the Republic of Ireland
