= 2004 Leitrim County Council election =

Part of the 2004 Irish local elections

- 11 June 2004

All 22 seats on Leitrim County Council
| | First party | Second party | Third party |
|---|---|---|---|
| Party | Fianna Fáil | Fine Gael | Sinn Féin |
| Seats won | 10 | 8 | 2 |
| Seat change | - | - | - |
| | Fourth party |
| Party | Independent |
| Seats won | 2 |
| Seat change | - |
- Map showing the area of Leitrim County Council
Council control after election
TBD

An election to Leitrim County Council took place on 11 June 2004 as part of that year's Irish local elections. 22 councillors were elected from four local electoral areas (LEAs) for a five-year term of office on the electoral system of proportional representation by means of the single transferable vote (PR-STV).

== Results by party ==
| Party | Seats | ± | First Pref. votes | FPv% | ±% |
|---|---|---|---|---|---|
| Fianna Fáil | 10 | 0 | 7,140 | 40.13 | |
| Fine Gael | 8 | 0 | 6,786 | 38.14 | |
| Sinn Féin | 2 | 0 | 1,987 | 11.17 | |
| Independent | 2 | 0 | 1,386 | 7.79 | |
| Totals | 22 | 0 | 17,794 | 100.00 | — |

== Results by local electoral area ==
=== Ballinamore ===
Ballinamore - 6 seats
| Party | Candidate | FPv% | Count | | | |
| Party | Candidate | FPv% | 1 | 2 | 3 | 4 |
|---|---|---|---|---|---|---|
| Sinn Féin | Martin Kenny* | 17.71 | 860 | | | |
| Fianna Fáil | Paddy O'Rourke | 15.63 | 759 | | | |
| Fine Gael | Damien Brennan* | 15.24 | 740 | | | |
| Fianna Fáil | Caillian Ellis* | 14.33 | 696 | | | |
| Fianna Fáil | J.J. Shortt* | 13.06 | 634 | 690 | 723 | |
| Fine Gael | Gordon Hughes | 12.77 | 620 | 679 | 683 | 707 |
| Fine Gael | John McCartin | 5.36 | 547 | 598 | 626 | 648 |
Electorate: 6,421 Valid: 4,856 (75.63%) Spoilt: 44 Quota: 694 Turnout: 4,900 (76.31%)

=== Carrick-on-Shannon ===
Carrick-on-Shannon - 6 seats
| Party | Candidate | FPv% | Count | | | | | | | |
| Party | Candidate | FPv% | 1 | 2 | 3 | 4 | 5 | 6 | 7 | 8 |
|---|---|---|---|---|---|---|---|---|---|---|
| Fianna Fáil | Seán McGowan* | 16.02 | 770 | | | | | | | |
| Independent | Enda Stenson* | 15.69 | 754 | | | | | | | |
| Fine Gael | Gerry Reynolds* | 14.08 | 677 | 687 | | | | | | |
| Fine Gael | Thomas Mulligan* | 12.09 | 581 | 601 | 651 | 674 | 739 | | | |
| Fianna Fáil | Sinead Guckian* | 11.28 | 542 | 564 | 576 | 589 | 644 | 654 | 807 | |
| Fianna Fáil | Gerry McGee* | 8.32 | 400 | 416 | 432 | 441 | 465 | 479 | 492 | 504 |
| Fianna Fáil | Liam McElgunn* | 7.97 | 383 | 386 | 386 | 393 | 415 | 416 | 519 | 591 |
| Fine Gael | Percy French | 7.26 | 349 | 353 | 360 | 370 | 384 | 393 | | |
| Sinn Féin | Maura Mulvey | 4.66 | 224 | 229 | 257 | 262 | | | | |
| Independent | John McCrann | 2.64 | 127 | 130 | | | | | | |
Electorate: 6,902 Valid: 4,807 (69.65%) Spoilt: 36 Quota: 687 Turnout: 4,843 (70.17%)

=== Dromahaire ===
Dromahaire - 5 seats
| Party | Candidate | FPv% | Count | | | | | |
| Party | Candidate | FPv% | 1 | 2 | 3 | 4 | 5 | 6 |
|---|---|---|---|---|---|---|---|---|
| Fine Gael | John McTernan* | 16.66 | 722 | | | | | |
| Fianna Fáil | Francis Gilmartin* | 13.66 | 592 | 602 | 620 | 646 | 754 | |
| Fine Gael | Carmel McPadden* | 11.70 | 507 | 518 | 536 | 578 | 596 | 601 |
| Independent | Gerry Dolan* | 11.65 | 505 | 529 | 617 | 667 | 767 | |
| Fine Gael | Enda McGloin | 11.07 | 480 | 484 | 499 | 504 | 686 | 714 |
| Fianna Fáil | Mary Bohan* | 11.65 | 456 | 461 | 495 | 612 | 657 | 668 |
| Fianna Fáil | Sean Nolan | 8.68 | 429 | 430 | 450 | 475 | | |
| Fianna Fáil | Eugene O'Neill | 8.68 | 295 | 301 | 318 | | | |
| Sinn Féin | John McCauley | 8.68 | 241 | 260 | | | | |
| Green | Johnny Gogan | 8.68 | 108 | | | | | |
Electorate: 5,788 Valid: 4,335 (74.90%) Spoilt: 50 Quota: 723 Turnout: 4,385 (75.66%)

=== Manorhamilton ===
Manorhamilton - 5 seats
| Party | Candidate | FPv% | Count | | | |
| Party | Candidate | FPv% | 1 | 2 | 3 | 4 |
|---|---|---|---|---|---|---|
| Fianna Fáil | Tony Ferguson* | 19.28 | 732 | | | |
| Sinn Féin | Michael Colreavy* | 17.44 | 662 | | | |
| Fine Gael | Séan McDermott | 16.10 | 611 | 617 | 622 | 714 |
| Fine Gael | Frank Dolan* | 15.38 | 584 | 588 | 594 | 684 |
| Fianna Fáil | Aodh Flynn* | 11.91 | 452 | 487 | 493 | 603 |
| Labour | Gabriel McSharry | 10.19 | 387 | 394 | 402 | |
| Fine Gael | Siobhán McGloin* | 7.66 | 368 | 415 | 419 | 469 |
Electorate: 5,452 Valid: 3,796 (69.63%) Spoilt: 55 Quota: 633 Turnout: 3,851 (70.63%)
