= 2019 Leitrim County Council election =

Part of the 2019 Irish local elections

← 2014	24 May 2019	2024 →

All 18 seats on Leitrim County Council 10 seats needed for a majority
	First party	Second party	Third party
Party	Fianna Fáil	Fine Gael	Sinn Féin
Seats won	6	6	2
Seat change	Steady	▲2	▼2
	Fourth party
Party	Independent
Seats won	4
Seat change	Steady
- Results by Local Electoral Area

An election to all 18 seats on Leitrim County Council was held on 24 May 2019 as part of the 2019 Irish local elections. County Leitrim was divided into 3 local electoral areas (LEAs) to elect councillors for a five-year term of office on the electoral system of proportional representation by means of the single transferable vote (PR-STV).

== Boundary review ==
Following the recommendations of the 2018 LEA boundary review committee, no changes were made to the LEAs used in the 2014 elections.

== Results by party ==
Party	Seats	±	1st pref	FPv%	±%
Fianna Fáil	6	Steady	6,128	34.39	▲0.71
Fine Gael	6	▲2	4,394	24.66	▼2.63
Sinn Féin	2	▼2	3,061	17.18	▼2.01
Green	0	Steady	389	2.18	New
Renua	0	Steady	43	0.24	New
Independent	4	Steady	3,806	21.36	▲1.52
Total	18	Steady	17,821	100.00	Steady

== Results by local electoral area ==
*: Outgoing councillor elected in 2014.

=== Ballinamore ===
Ballinamore: 6 seats
Party	Candidate	FPv%	Count							
Party	Candidate	FPv%	1	2	3	4	5	6	7	8
Fianna Fáil	Paddy O'Rourke	20.87%	1,365							
Fianna Fáil	Caillian Ellis	14.57%	953							
Sinn Féin	Brendan Barry	11.70%	765	781	787	790	855	981		
Fine Gael	Enda McGloin	11.52%	753	772	777	778	882	888	890	895
Fine Gael	Ita Reynolds-Flynn	10.63%	695	816	821	825	855	950		
Sinn Féin	Pat Gilhooley	9.73%	636	673	675	678	700	807	841	845
Independent	Gerry Dolan	8.63%	564	628	650	653	786	835	845	851
Independent	Sean Wynne	6.10%	399	436	455	456				
Sinn Féin	Caroline Mulvey	5.18%	339	457	464	467	492			
Renua	Oisín O'Dwyer	0.66%	43	55						
Independent	Denis O'Brien	0.41%	27	34						
Electorate: 9,892 Valid: 6,539 Spoilt: 74 Quota: 935 Turnout: 6,613 (66.85%)

=== Carrick-on-Shannon ===
Carrick-on-Shannon: 6 seats
Party	Candidate	FPv%	Count						
Party	Candidate	FPv%	1	2	3	4	5	6	7
Fianna Fáil	Sean McGowan	14.96%	847						
Independent	Enda Stenson	12.88%	729	737	768	810			
Fine Gael	Thomas Mulligan	12.19%	690	696	708	720	737	824	
Fianna Fáil	Fintan Cox	11.29%	639	642	659	667	703	737	738
Fine Gael	Finola Armstrong-Maguire	10.87%	615	616	645	670	727	752	754
Fianna Fáil	Paddy Farrell	9.72%	550	556	583	611	658	737	742
Independent	Des Guckian	9.36%	530	538	548	577	639	751	758
Sinn Féin	Séadhna Logan	7.17%	406	408	428	440	481		
Independent	Yvonne Hollidge	4.73%	268	270	289	321			
Independent	Sean Wynne	3.43%	194	195	203				
Green	Leslie O'Hora	1.82%	103	104					
Independent	Denis O'Brien	1.57%	89	89					
Electorate: 9,027 Valid: 5,660 Spoilt: 69 Quota: 809 Turnout: 5,729 (63.47%)

=== Manorhamilton ===
Manorhamilton: 6 seats
Party	Candidate	FPv%	Count				
Party	Candidate	FPv%	1	2	3	4	5
Fianna Fáil	Mary Bohan	16.67%	937				
Sinn Féin	Padraig Fallon	16.28%	915				
Fianna Fáil	Justin Warnock	14.89%	837				
Fine Gael	Frank Dolan	12.54%	705	749	768	828	
Independent	Felim Gurn	12.33%	693	733	769	798	808
Fine Gael	Seán McDermott	11.76%	661	676	695	767	778
Independent	Jamie Murphy	5.57%	313	322	340	360	366
Green	Bláithín Gallagher	5.09%	286	306	320	345	351
Fine Gael	John Joe Dowdican	4.89%	275	280	285		
Electorate: 9,058 Valid: 5,622 Spoilt: 71 Quota: 804 Turnout: 5,693 (62.85%)

== Results by gender ==
2019 Leitrim County Council election Candidates by gender
Gender	Number of candidates	% of candidates	Elected councillors	% of councillors
Men	26	81.3%	15	83.3%
Women	6	18.8%	3	16.7%
TOTAL	32		18	
