= 1985 Leitrim County Council election =

Part of the 1985 Irish local elections

- 20 June 1985

All 22 seats on Leitrim County Council
	First party	Second party	Third party
Party	Fianna Fáil	Fine Gael	Sinn Féin
Seats won	10	8	2
Seat change	0	-2	+1
	Fourth party	Fifth party
Party	Independent Fianna Fáil	Independent
Seats won	1	1
Seat change	+1	0
- Map showing the area of Leitrim County Council
Council control after election
TBD

An election to Leitrim County Council took place on 20 June 1985 as part of the Irish local elections. 22 councillors were elected from four local electoral areas (LEAs) for a five-year term of office on the electoral system of proportional representation by means of the single transferable vote (PR-STV). This term was extended for a further year, to 1991.

== Results by party ==
Party	Seats	±	First Pref. votes	FPv%	±%
Fianna Fáil	10	-	7,731	45.31	
Fine Gael	8	-2	5,905	34.6	
Sinn Féin	2	+1	1,854	10.87	
Independent Fianna Fáil	1	+1	476	2.79	
Independent	1	-	1,096	6.42	
Totals	22		17,062	100.00	—

== Results by local electoral area ==
=== Ballinamore ===
Ballinamore: 6 seats
Party	Candidate	FPv%	Count					
Party	Candidate	FPv%	1	2	3	4	5	6
Fine Gael	Gerry Reynolds		834					
Fianna Fáil	John Ellis TD*		733					
Sinn Féin	John Joe McGirl*		706					
Fianna Fáil	J.J. Shortt*		582	594	614	742		
Fine Gael	Tommy McCartin*		515	566	569	601	808	
Fine Gael	Damien Brennan*		473	497	499	504	598	708
Fianna Fáil	Christy Gallogly		375	410	428	479	499	513
Fine Gael	Brendan Grimes		299	326	327	374		
Fianna Fáil	John Reilly		265	266	271			
Electorate: 5,568 Valid: 4,782 (86.4%) Spoilt: 29 Quota: 684 Turnout: 4,811

=== Carrick-on-Shannon ===
Carrick-on-Shannon: 6 seats
Party	Candidate	FPv%	Count				
Party	Candidate	FPv%	1	2	3	4	5
Independent	Pascal McKeon*		793				
Fianna Fáil	Michael Guckian*		717				
Fine Gael	Jim Faughnan		522	582	598	640	
Fianna Fáil	Farrell McElgunn*		494	497	525	650	
Fianna Fáil	Gerry McGee		477	510	527	562	587
Fine Gael	Thomas Mulligan		383	418	421	432	664
Fianna Fáil	Seán McGowan		363	380	391	429	449
Fine Gael	John Maguire		338	340	344	386	
Sinn Féin	Martin McTiernan		322	335	343		
Electorate: 5,484 Valid: 4,409 (81%) Spoilt: 33 Quota: 630 Turnout: 4,442

=== Dromahaire ===
Dromahaire: 5 seats
Party	Candidate	FPv%	Count					
Party	Candidate	FPv%	1	2	3	4	5	6
Fianna Fáil	Mary Bohan*		662					
Fianna Fáil	Joseph Mooney*		598	614	617	750		
Fine Gael	Jim McPadden		477	543	545	553	561	589
Sinn Féin	Mel Farrell		472	501	504	537	548	704
Fine Gael	Joseph McLoughlin*		379	472	474	480	485	590
Fine Gael	P.J. Lynch*		361	376	376	462	482	504
Fianna Fáil	Ben McKeon		324	329	331			
Fianna Fáil	Michael Dolan		307	342	350	408	472	
Fine Gael	Leo McHugh		269					
Electorate: 4,713 Valid: 3,849 (82.3%) Spoilt: 30 Quota: 642 Turnout: 3,879

=== Manorhamilton ===
Manorhamilton: 5 seats
Party	Candidate	FPv%	Count							
Party	Candidate	FPv%	1	2	3	4	5	6	7	8
Fianna Fáil	Tony Ferguson*		899							
Fianna Fáil	Aodh Flynn*		662	721						
Fine Gael	Charles Cullen*		480	497	500	533	629	705		
Independent Fianna Fáil	Larry McGowan*		476	504	513	521	579	750		
Fine Gael	Stanley Trotter		401	411	414	472	503	529	545	562
Sinn Féin	Michael Colreavy		354	374	376	389	445			
Independent	John Cullen		303	335	337	361				
Fianna Fáil	Patrick Gallagher*		273	325	355	399	483	539	575	592
Fine Gael	Don Daly		174	184	185					
Electorate: 5,074 Valid: 4,022 (79.94%) Spoilt: 34 Quota: 671 Turnout: 4,056
