= Honan =

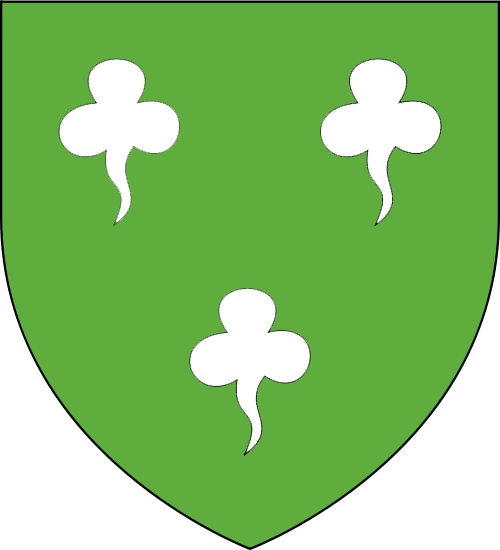
Honan coat of arms.

Honan (Irish: Ó hEoghanáin), is an Irish surname, possibly originating in County Clare.

== Notable people ==
Notable people with this surname include:

- Bob Honan, Australian rugby player
- Cathy Honan, Irish politician
- Colm Honan, Irish hurler
- Darach Honan, Irish hurler
- Dermot Honan, Irish politician
- Kevin Honan, American politician
- Lisa Honan, British diplomat
- Marty Honan, American baseball player
- Park Honan, American academic
- T. V. Honan, Irish politician
- Thomas M. Honan, American politician
- Tras Honan, Irish politician
