= 1991 Leitrim County Council election =

Part of the 1991 Irish local elections

- 27 June 1991

All 22 seats on Leitrim County Council
	First party	Second party	Third party
Party	Fianna Fáil	Fine Gael	Sinn Féin
Seats won	9	9	1
Seat change	-1	+1	-1
	Fourth party	Fifth party
Party	Independent Fianna Fáil	Independent
Seats won	1	2
Seat change	0	+1
- Map showing the area of Leitrim County Council
Council control after election
TBD

An election to Leitrim County Council took place on 27 June 1991 as part of that year's Irish local elections. 22 councillors were elected from four local electoral areas (LEAs) for a five-year term of office on the electoral system of proportional representation by means of the single transferable vote (PR-STV). This term was extended twice, first to 1998, then to 1999.

== Results by party ==
Party	Seats	±	First Pref. votes	FPv%	±%
Fianna Fáil	9	-1	6,735	43.35	
Fine Gael	9	+1	5,481	35.28	
Sinn Féin	1	-1	1,398	9.0	
Independent Fianna Fáil	1	0	402	2.6	
Independent	2	+1	1,485	9.6	
Totals	22	0	15,535	100.00	—

== Results by local electoral area ==
=== Ballinamore ===
Ballinamore - 6 seats
Party	Candidate	FPv%	Count				
Party	Candidate	FPv%	1	2	3	4	5
Fine Gael	Gerry Reynolds TD*	18.3%	766				
Fianna Fáil	John Ellis TD*	17.2%	720				
Fianna Fáil	J.J. Shortt*	16.3%	680				
Sinn Féin	Liam McGirl*	16.0%	667				
Fine Gael	Damien Brennan*	13.2%	552	609			
Fine Gael	Tommy McCartin*	10.4%	435	535	563	579	619
Fianna Fáil	Paddy O'Rourke	8.6%	358	370	465	532	562
Electorate: 5,674 Valid: 4,178 (73.63%) Spoilt: 24 Quota: 597 Turnout: 4,202 (74.06%)

=== Carrick-on-Shannon ===
Carrick-on-Shannon - 6 seats
Party	Candidate	FPv%	Count					
Party	Candidate	FPv%	1	2	3	4	5	6
Fine Gael	Thomas Mulligan*	13.4%	565	578	605			
Fianna Fáil	Michael Guckian*	13.3%	563	596	639			
Fine Gael	Thomas Faughnan	11.7%	497	535	564	571	701	
Independent	Pascal McKeon*	11.7%	494	512	534	534	547	573
Fianna Fáil	Seán McGowan	11.3%	480	512	529	532	536	545
Fianna Fáil	Gerry McGee*	9.9%	420	421	431	432	437	450
Fianna Fáil	Farrell McElgunn*	9.5%	400	408	483	499	685	
Fine Gael	Ann Harman	8.%	339	360	415	420		
Sinn Féin	Martin McTiernan	6.7%	285	302				
Independent	Des Guckian	4.4%	187					
Electorate: 5,706 Valid: 4,230 (74.13%) Spoilt: 28 Quota: 605 Turnout: 4,258 (74.62%)

=== Dromahaire ===
Dromahaire - 5 seats
Party	Candidate	FPv%	Count							
Party	Candidate	FPv%	1	2	3	4	5	6	7	8
Fine Gael	Jim McPadden*	13.3%	479	501	527	539	638			
Fianna Fáil	Mary Bohan*	12.2%	437	478	483	490	510	514	514	663
Fianna Fáil	Senator Paschal Mooney	11.7%	422	426	467	483	555	567	569	600
Fine Gael	John McTernan	11%	397	406	407	408	444	459	460	624
Fianna Fáil	Stasia Carre	10.7%	385	401	402	405	411	411	411	
Independent	Gerry Dolan	9.6%	344	372	418	529	604			
Fianna Fáil	Francis Gilmartin	8.7%	313	314	333	386	405	412	413	453
Fine Gael	Sean Wynne	8.2%	295	302	326	340				
Sinn Féin	Francis Guckian	5.4%	193	209	226					
Independent	Michael Moran	4.9%	175	182						
Independent	John Gallagher	4.3%	154							
Electorate: 4,569 Valid: 3,594 (78.7%) Spoilt: 34 Quota: 600 Turnout: 3,628 (79.4%)

=== Manorhamilton ===
Manorhamilton - 5 seats
Party	Candidate	FPv%	Count						
Party	Candidate	FPv%	1	2	3	4	5	6	7
Fianna Fáil	Tony Ferguson*	21.2%	742						
Fianna Fáil	Aodh Flynn*	14.6%	511	542	548	602			
Fine Gael	Charles Cullen*	12.7%	444	457	462	501	504	648	
Independent Fianna Fáil	Larry McGowan*	11.5%	402	421	451	534	541	673	
Fine Gael	Frank Dolan	10.3%	361	366	369	386	388		
Fine Gael	Siobhán McGloin	10%	351	381	420	456	458	526	552
Fianna Fáil	Patsy Connolly	8.7%	304	349	365	387	391	409	442
Sinn Féin	Michael Colreavy	7.2%	253	261	285				
Republican Sinn Féin	Declan Curneen	3.7%	131	138					
Electorate: 4,766 Valid: 3,533 (74.13%) Spoilt: 36 Quota: 584 Turnout: 3,569 (74.88%)
