= 1999 Leitrim County Council election =

- 10 June 1999

All 22 seats to Leitrim County Council
	First party	Second party	Third party
Party	Fianna Fáil	Fine Gael	Sinn Féin
Seats won	10	8	2
Seat change	+1	-1	+1
	Fourth party
Party	Independent
Seats won	2
Seat change	-1
- Map showing the area of Leitrim County Council
Council control after election
TBD

An election to Leitrim County Council took place on 10 June 1999 as part of that year's Irish local elections. 22 councillors were elected from four local electoral areas for a five-year term of office on the system of proportional representation by means of the single transferable vote (PR-STV).

== Results by party ==
Party	Seats	±	First Pref. votes	FPv%	±%
Fianna Fáil	10	+1	7,020	43.21	
Fine Gael	8	-1	6,761	41.61	
Sinn Féin	2	+1	1,286	7.92	
Independent	2	-1	895	5.51	
Totals	22	0	16,247	100.00	—

== Results by local electoral area ==
=== Ballinamore ===
Ballinamore - 6 seats
Party	Candidate	FPv%	Count					
Party	Candidate	FPv%	1	2	3	4	5	6
Fianna Fáil	Caillian Ellis	19.71	855					
Fine Gael	Tommy McCartin*	16.57	719					
Fine Gael	Damien Brennan*	14.27	619	638				
Fine Gael	Gerry Reynolds	13.92	604	646				
Fianna Fáil	J.J. Shortt*	11.92	517	577	597	605	611	621
Sinn Féin	Liam McGirl*	11.78	511	567	593	606	608	615
Fianna Fáil	Paddy O'Rourke	11.36	493	550	597	601	605	608
Independent	Sean McBrien	0.48	21	22	28	29	30	
Electorate: 5,883 Valid: 4,339 (73.75%) Spoilt: 42 Quota: 620 Turnout: 4,381 (74.47%)

=== Carrick-on-Shannon ===
Carrick-on-Shannon - 6 seats
Party	Candidate	FPv%	Count							
Party	Candidate	FPv%	1	2	3	4	5	6	7	8
Fianna Fáil	Seán McGowan*	16.30	704							
Fine Gael	Thomas Mulligan*	13.59	587	597	646					
Fianna Fáil	Gerry McGee	8.32	558	576	603	616	620			
Fianna Fáil	Sinead Guckian	11.28	488	502	516	517	564	648		
Independent	Enda Stenson	9.84	425	435	480	488	550	651		
Fianna Fáil	Liam McElgunn	9.35	404	406	417	417	495	560	577	597
Fine Gael	T.P. Cox	8.31	359	384	400	404	435	545	561	571
Fine Gael	Percy French	7.41	320	321	324	325	397			
Fine Gael	Marese O'Brien	6.85	296	297	300	301				
Sinn Féin	John Reynolds	4.14	179	184						
Electorate: 6,201 Valid: 4,320 (69.67%) Spoilt: 31 Quota: 618 Turnout: 4,351 (70.17%)

=== Dromahaire ===
Dromahaire - 5 seats
Party	Candidate	FPv%	Count					
Party	Candidate	FPv%	1	2	3	4	5	6
Fine Gael	John McTernan*	18.15	710					
Fine Gael	Jim McPadden*	15.77	617	631	650	690		
Fianna Fáil	Francis Gilmartin	11.78	461	462	495	512	512	611
Independent	Gerry Dolan*	11.48	449	456	537	584	596	676
Fine Gael	Enda McGloin	10.05	393	397	403	410	419	536
Fianna Fáil	Mary Bohan*	9.87	386	393	435	592	600	668
Fianna Fáil	Senator Paschal Mooney*	8.56	335	336	363	389	390	
Fianna Fáil	Eugene O'Neill	8.15	319	339	354			
Sinn Féin	Hugh Gallagher	6.19	242	245				
Electorate: 5,166 Valid: 3,912 (75.73%) Spoilt: 41 Quota: 653 Turnout: 3,953 (76.52%)

=== Manorhamilton ===
Manorhamilton - 5 seats
Party	Candidate	FPv%	Count				
Party	Candidate	FPv%	1	2	3	4	5
Fianna Fáil	Tony Ferguson*	18.49	679				
Fine Gael	Frank Dolan*	14.16	520	523	572	626	
Fianna Fáil	Aodh Flynn*	13.67	505	515	554	626	
Fine Gael	Siobhán McGloin*	11.46	421	438	462	502	632
Sinn Féin	Michael Colreavy	9.64	354	357	392	475	558
Fine Gael	Francis White	9.50	349	352	381	425	483
Fianna Fáil	Vincent Connolly	8.60	316	339	354	374	
Labour	Gabriel McSharry	7.76	285	288	341		
Fine Gael	Sean O'Donnell	6.72	247	248			
Electorate: 5,057 Valid: 3,673 (72.63%) Spoilt: 61 Quota: 613 Turnout: 3,734 (73.84%)
