= Patrick J. Reynolds (politician) =

Irish politician (1920–2003)

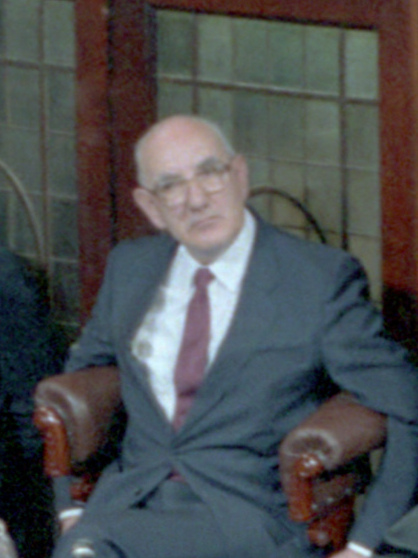
- Reynolds in 1984

Cathaoirleach of Seanad Éireann
- In office 23 February 1983 – 25 April 1987
- Preceded by: Tras Honan
- Succeeded by: Tras Honan

Parliamentary Secretary
- 1976–1977: Local Government
- 1976–1977: Public Service

Senator
- In office 27 October 1977 – 25 April 1987
- Constituency: Industrial and Commercial Panel
- In office 5 November 1969 – 28 February 1973
- Constituency: Administrative Panel

Teachta Dála
- In office February 1973 – June 1977
- Constituency: Roscommon–Leitrim
- In office October 1961 – June 1969
- Constituency: Roscommon

Personal details
- Born: 25 November 1920 Killellan, County Leitrim, Ireland
- Died: 27 December 2003 (aged 83) Ballinamore, County Leitrim, Ireland
- Party: Fine Gael
- Spouse: Tess Reynolds
- Children: 4, including Gerry
- Parents: Patrick Reynolds (father); Mary Reynolds (mother)

Patrick Joseph Reynolds (25 November 1920 – 27 December 2003) was an Irish Fine Gael politician who served three terms in Dáil Éireann and five in Seanad Éireann, where he was Cathaoirleach (chairperson) for four years.

== Family and early life ==
Reynolds was born in Killellan, County Leitrim in 1920. His father Patrick Reynolds was elected as a Cumann na nGaedheal Teachta Dála (TD) for Leitrim–Sligo at the September 1927 general election, but was fatally shot during the 1932 general election campaign. The election in Leitrim–Sligo was postponed, and his mother Mary won the seat, serving the Dáil for 24 years.

He was educated locally, receiving only a primary school education before his father's death forced him to leave school and join the family business. He built the business successfully, transforming the hardware shop which he had inherited from into one of the largest builders' suppliers and hardware merchants in the north west.

With his wife Tess, he had two sons, Gerry and Peter, and two daughters, Ita and Regina. Gerry continued the family's political tradition, serving like his father as a Fine Gael TD and senator.

== Political career ==
Reynolds was first elected to Leitrim County Council in 1943, and served as a councillor for more than 40 years, taking a particular interest in rural electrification and group water schemes. He was the longest-serving chair of the council, holding the office for 12 years from 1967 to 1979.

He was first elected to the 17th Dáil at the 1961 general election, as a TD for the Roscommon constituency. He was re-elected at the 1965 general election, but at the 1969 general election he was defeated in the new Roscommon–Leitrim constituency. He was then elected to the 12th Seanad by the Administrative Panel.

The 1960s proved to be a fallow period for Fine Gael as the party was out of power for the entire decade, but at the 1973 general election a Fine Gael–Labour Party coalition government came to power and Reynolds was elected to the 20th Dáil for Roscommon–Leitrim. In 1976, he was appointed Parliamentary Secretary to the Minister for Local Government and to the Minister for the Public Service. In spite of this appointment, Reynolds lost his Dáil seat at the 1977 general election. Following this defeat, he secured election to the 14th Seanad on the Industrial and Commercial Panel, which re-elected him to the 15th Seanad in 1981, the 16th Seanad in 1982 and 17th Seanad in 1983.

He was elected on 23 February 1983 as Cathaoirleach of the 17th Seanad, succeeding Tras Honan. He held the office until he stepped down from the Seanad at the 1987 election.

Reynolds died on 27 December 2003, aged 83, and was buried in his home town of Ballinamore, County Leitrim. Tributes in the Seanad after his death described him as a traditionalist or conservative, but praised his warmth, fairness and integrity, and the Irish Independent described his hospitality as "legendary".

== See also ==
- Families in the Oireachtas

Political offices
Preceded by Oliver J. Flanagan	Parliamentary Secretary to the Minister for Local Government; 1976–1977	Office abolished
New office	Parliamentary Secretary to the Minister for the Public Service; 1976–1977	Office abolished
Oireachtas
Preceded by Tras Honan	Cathaoirleach of Seanad Éireann; 1983–1987	Succeeded by Tras Honan

Dáil	Election	Deputy (Party)	Deputy (Party)	Deputy (Party)	Deputy (Party)
4th	1923	George Noble Plunkett (Rep)	Henry Finlay (CnaG)	Gerald Boland (Rep)	Andrew Lavin (CnaG)
4th	1925 by-election	George Noble Plunkett (Rep)	Martin Conlon (CnaG)	Gerald Boland (Rep)	Andrew Lavin (CnaG)
5th	1927 (Jun)	Patrick O'Dowd (FF)	Martin Conlon (CnaG)	Gerald Boland (FF)	Michael Brennan (Ind.)
6th	1927 (Sep)	Patrick O'Dowd (FF)	Martin Conlon (CnaG)	Gerald Boland (FF)	Michael Brennan (Ind.)
7th	1932	Daniel O'Rourke (FF)	Martin Conlon (CnaG)	Gerald Boland (FF)	Frank MacDermot (NCP)
8th	1933	Patrick O'Dowd (FF)	Michael Brennan (CnaG)	Gerald Boland (FF)	Frank MacDermot (NCP)
9th	1937	Michael Brennan (FG)	Daniel O'Rourke (FF)	Gerald Boland (FF)	3 seats 1937–1948
10th	1938	Michael Brennan (FG)	Daniel O'Rourke (FF)	Gerald Boland (FF)	3 seats 1937–1948
11th	1943	John Meighan (CnaT)	John Beirne (CnaT)	Gerald Boland (FF)	3 seats 1937–1948
12th	1944	Daniel O'Rourke (FF)	John Beirne (CnaT)	Gerald Boland (FF)	3 seats 1937–1948
13th	1948	Daniel O'Rourke (FF)	John Beirne (CnaT)	Gerald Boland (FF)	Jack McQuillan (CnaP)
14th	1951	John Finan (CnaT)	John Beirne (CnaT)	Gerald Boland (FF)	Jack McQuillan (Ind.)
15th	1954	James Burke (FG)	John Beirne (CnaT)	Gerald Boland (FF)	Jack McQuillan (Ind.)
16th	1957	James Burke (FG)	John Beirne (CnaT)	Gerald Boland (FF)	Jack McQuillan (Ind.)
17th	1961	James Burke (FG)	Patrick J. Reynolds (FG)	Brian Lenihan Snr (FF)	Jack McQuillan (NPD)
17th	1964 by-election	Joan Burke (FG)	Patrick J. Reynolds (FG)	Brian Lenihan Snr (FF)	Jack McQuillan (NPD)
18th	1965	Joan Burke (FG)	Patrick J. Reynolds (FG)	Brian Lenihan Snr (FF)	Hugh Gibbons (FF)
19th	1969	Constituency abolished. See Roscommon–Leitrim			

Dáil	Election	Deputy (Party)	Deputy (Party)	Deputy (Party)
22nd	1981	Terry Leyden (FF)	Seán Doherty (FF)	John Connor (FG)
23rd	1982 (Feb)	Terry Leyden (FF)	Seán Doherty (FF)	Liam Naughten (FG)
24th	1982 (Nov)	Terry Leyden (FF)	Seán Doherty (FF)	Liam Naughten (FG)
25th	1987	Terry Leyden (FF)	Seán Doherty (FF)	Liam Naughten (FG)
26th	1989	Terry Leyden (FF)	Tom Foxe (Ind.)	John Connor (FG)
27th	1992	Constituency abolished. See Longford–Roscommon		

Dáil	Election	Deputy (Party)	Deputy (Party)	Deputy (Party)
19th	1969	Hugh Gibbons (FF)	Brian Lenihan (FF)	Joan Burke (FG)
20th	1973	Hugh Gibbons (FF)	Patrick J. Reynolds (FG)	Joan Burke (FG)
21st	1977	Terry Leyden (FF)	Seán Doherty (FF)	Joan Burke (FG)
22nd	1981	Constituency abolished. See Roscommon and Sligo–Leitrim		
