= 2009 Leitrim County Council election =

Part of the 2009 Irish local elections

- 5 June 2009

22 seats on Leitrim County Council
	First party	Second party	Third party
Party	Fine Gael	Fianna Fáil	Sinn Féin
Seats won	10	8	2
Seat change	+2	-2	-
	Fourth party
Party	Independent
Seats won	2
Seat change	-
- Map showing the area of Leitrim County Council
Council control after election
TBD

An election to Leitrim County Council took place on 5 June 2009 as part of that year's Irish local elections. 22 councillors were elected from four local electoral areas (LEAs) for a five-year term of office on the electoral system of proportional representation by means of the single transferable vote (PR-STV).

== Results by party ==
Party	Seats	±	First Pref. votes	FPv%	±%
Fine Gael	10	+2	6,963	37.07	
Fianna Fáil	8	-2	6,007	31.98	
Sinn Féin	2	-	2,418	12.87	
Independent	2	-	2,864	15.25	
Totals	22	-	18,781	100.00	—

== Results by local electoral area ==
=== Ballinamore ===
Ballinamore - 5 seats
Party	Candidate	FPv%	Count		
Party	Candidate	FPv%	1	2	3
Fianna Fáil	Paddy O'Rourke*	17.29	877		
Fianna Fáil	Caillian Ellis*	16.82	853		
Fine Gael	John McCartin	16.78	851		
Fine Gael	Damien Brennan*	14.10	715	730	752
Fine Gael	Gordon Hughes	13.33	676	759	846
Sinn Féin	Martin Kenny*	13.03	661	959	
Sinn Féin	Maureen Martin	8.64	438		
Electorate: 6,671 Valid: 5,071 (76.02%) Spoilt: 48 Quota: 846 Turnout: 5,119 (76.74%)

=== Carrick-on-Shannon ===
Carrick-on-Shannon - 7 seats
Party	Candidate	FPv%	Count									
Party	Candidate	FPv%	1	2	3	4	5	6	7	8	9	10
Independent	Enda Stenson*	18.54	983									
Fianna Fáil	Seán McGowan*	12.61	672									
Fianna Fáil	Gerry Kilrane	10.90	581	634	650	657	686					
Fine Gael	Thomas Mulligan*	10.06	536	579	596	598	628	670				
Fianna Fáil	Sinead Guckian*	8.82	470	504	507	523	530	554	685			
Fine Gael	Gerry Reynolds*	7.49	399	442	443	461	464	473	545	546	554	606
Fine Gael	John Ward	6.98	372	410	414	422	437	453	468	475	477	579
Labour	John Feely	5.35	285	307	308	325	330	367	409	410	416	472
Independent	Des Guckian	5.27	281	300	303	328	337	374	382	386	388	
Fianna Fáil	Liam McElgunn*	5.01	267	288	289	297	300	312				
Sinn Féin	Chris Cronin	3.62	193	206	215	222	238					
Independent	Stephen Flynn	2.08	111	130	123	132	133					
Green	Garreth McDaid	1.97	105	117	118							
Independent	Bernard McDonagh	0.75	40	42								
Independent	John McCrann	0.64	34	38								
Electorate: 7,723 Valid: 5,329 (69.00%) Spoilt: 44 Quota: 667 Turnout: 5,373 (69.57%)

=== Dromahaire ===
Dromahaire - 5 seats
Party	Candidate	FPv%	Count				
Party	Candidate	FPv%	1	2	3	4	5
Fine Gael	Enda McGloin*	17.69	814				
Fine Gael	John McTernan*	17.54	807				
Independent	Gerry Dolan*	14.45	665	701	719	943	
Fianna Fáil	Francis Gilmartin*	14.10	649	661	674	716	751
Fianna Fáil	Mary Bohan*	13.17	606	625	626	692	768
Sinn Féin	Padraig Fallon	10.50	483	509	511	582	627
Fine Gael	Sean Loughlin	9.54	439	452	464		
Green	Johnny Gogan	3.02	139				
Electorate: 6,034 Valid: 4,602 (76.27%) Spoilt: 47 Quota: 768 Turnout: 4,649 (77.05%)

=== Manorhamilton ===
Manorhamilton - 5 seats
Party	Candidate	FPv%	Count				
Party	Candidate	FPv%	1	2	3	4	5
Fine Gael	Séan McDermott*	16.10	691	695	758		
Sinn Féin	Michael Colreavy*	14.98	643	716			
Fine Gael	Frank Dolan*	14.12	606	613	721		
Fianna Fáil	Tony Ferguson*	13.37	574	635	764		
Fine Gael	Siobhán McGloin	13.30	571	618	655	672	693
Independent	Gabriel McSharry	12.07	518	527	619	650	671
Fianna Fáil	Pat Munday	10.67	458	468			
Independent	Thomas Kelly	5.40	232				
Electorate: 5,849 Valid: 4,293 (69.63%) Spoilt: 45 Quota: 716 Turnout: 4,338 (70.63%)
