= Patrick Reynolds (Cumann na nGaedheal politician) =

Irish politician (1887–1932)

Teachta Dála
- In office September 1927 – 14 February 1932
- Constituency: Leitrim–Sligo

Personal details
- Born: 1 March 1887 Gorvagh, County Leitrim, Ireland
- Died: 14 February 1932 (aged 44) County Leitrim, Ireland
- Party: Cumann na nGaedheal
- Spouse: Mary Reynolds
- Children: 7, including Patrick J. Reynolds
- Relatives: Gerry Reynolds (grandson)
- Education: Marlborough Street College, Dublin

Patrick Reynolds (1 March 1887 – 14 February 1932) was an Irish Cumann na nGaedheal politician.

A merchant and farmer, he was elected to Dáil Éireann as a Cumann na nGaedheal Teachta Dála (TD) at the September 1927 general election for the Leitrim–Sligo constituency.

He was nominated as a candidate for the 1932 general election, but during the campaign he was shot and killed on 14 February 1932 by a former Royal Irish Constabulary (RIC) officer, Joseph Leddy. Garda Detective Patrick McGeehan who was trying to shield Reynolds was fatally wounded. The election in Leitrim–Sligo was then postponed. It was won by his widow Mary Reynolds, who would go on to serve in the Dáil for 25 years.

Leddy had helped the IRA during the Irish War of Independence and had received a pension on Reynolds' recommendation; the two were friends and drinking companions, but had recently fallen out over the small size of Leddy's pension, and Leddy had begun to support a rival politician. Leddy was tried in Dublin and received a one-year sentence for manslaughter, the jury citing provocation. Mary Reynolds received IR£1,000 in a civil lawsuit.

His son Patrick J. Reynolds, who took over and expanded the family business, was a long-serving member of Leitrim County Council, and also a Fine Gael TD and senator, serving as Cathaoirleach of the Seanad from 1983 to 1987. Pat Joe's son Gerry Reynolds was also a TD and senator.

== See also ==
- Families in the Oireachtas

| Dáil | Election | Deputy (Party) | Deputy (Party) | Deputy (Party) | Deputy (Party) | Deputy (Party) | Deputy (Party) | Deputy (Party) |
|---|---|---|---|---|---|---|---|---|
| 4th | 1923 | Martin McGowan (Rep) | Frank Carty (Rep) | Thomas Carter (CnaG) | Seán Farrell (Rep) | James Dolan (CnaG) | John Hennigan (CnaG) | Alexander McCabe (CnaG) |
| 4th | 1925 by-election | Martin McGowan (Rep) | Frank Carty (Rep) | Samuel Holt (Rep) | Seán Farrell (Rep) | James Dolan (CnaG) | John Hennigan (CnaG) | Martin Roddy (CnaG) |
| 5th | 1927 (Jun) | John Jinks (NL) | Frank Carty (FF) | Samuel Holt (FF) | Michael Carter (FP) | James Dolan (CnaG) | John Hennigan (CnaG) | Martin Roddy (CnaG) |
| 6th | 1927 (Sep) | Bernard Maguire (FF) | Frank Carty (FF) | Samuel Holt (FF) | Patrick Reynolds (CnaG) | James Dolan (CnaG) | John Hennigan (CnaG) | Martin Roddy (CnaG) |
| 6th | 1929 by-election | Bernard Maguire (FF) | Frank Carty (FF) | Seán Mac Eoin (CnaG) | Patrick Reynolds (CnaG) | James Dolan (CnaG) | John Hennigan (CnaG) | Martin Roddy (CnaG) |
| 7th | 1932 | Bernard Maguire (FF) | Frank Carty (FF) | Stephen Flynn (FF) | Mary Reynolds (CnaG) | William Browne (FF) | John Hennigan (CnaG) | Martin Roddy (CnaG) |
| 8th | 1933 | Bernard Maguire (FF) | Frank Carty (FF) | Stephen Flynn (FF) | Patrick Rogers (NCP) | William Browne (FF) | James Dolan (CnaG) | Martin Roddy (CnaG) |
| 9th | 1937 | Constituency abolished. See Sligo and Leitrim | | | | | | |
