= Honan (disambiguation) =

Honan may refer to:

- Henan, a Chinese province, often called "Honan" in older texts
- Honan, an Irish surname
- Honan, Burma, a town in Shan State
- Honan Chapel, in Cork, Ireland

== See also ==
- Hunan, a Chinese province
