= 2014 Leitrim County Council election =

Part of the 2014 Irish local elections

- 23 May 2014

All 18 seats to Leitrim County Council
	First party	Second party	Third party
Party	Fianna Fáil	Fine Gael	Sinn Féin
Seats won	6	4	4
Seat change	-2	-6	+2
	Fourth party
Party	Independent
Seats won	4
Seat change	+2
- Map showing the area of Leitrim County Council
Council control after election
TBD

An election to all 18 seats on Leitrim County Council took place on 23 May 2014, as part of the 2014 Irish local elections, a reduction from 22 seats at the 2009 election. County Leitrim was divided into three local electoral areas (LEAs) to elect councillors for a five-year term of office on the electoral system of proportional representation by means of the single transferable vote (PR-STV).

Fine Gael lost 6 seats, and their previously held overall majority while Fianna Fáil also lost 2 seats. Independents and Sinn Féin both increased their numbers by 2 despite the Council being reduced by 4 seats as a whole.

== Results by party ==
Party	Seats	±	1st pref	FPv%	±%
Fianna Fáil	6	-2	6,110	33.68	
Fine Gael	4	-6	4,952	27.29	
Sinn Féin	4	+2	3,481	19.19	
Independent	4	+2	3,601	19.84	
Total	18	-4	18,144	100.00	—

== Results by local electoral area ==
*: Outgoing councillor.

=== Ballinamore ===
Ballinamore: 6 seats
Party	Candidate	FPv%	Count						
Party	Candidate	FPv%	1	2	3	4	5	6	7
Fianna Fáil	Paddy O'Rourke	13.88	948	958	965	1,006			
Fianna Fáil	Caillian Ellis	11.61	793	821	873	983			
Sinn Féin	Martin Kenny†	10.57	722	737	917	925	929	951	954
Fine Gael	John McCartin	10.32	705	736	786	792	857	880	884
Sinn Féin	Brendan Barry	10.00	683	691	784	897	1,078		
Fine Gael	Gordon Hughes	9.29	635	674	732	751	823	847	848
Fine Gael	Enda McGloin	8.43	576	579	580	683			
Independent	Gerry Dolan	8.42	575	597	630	735	998		
Fianna Fáil	Francis Gilmartin	7.71	527	530	534				
Sinn Féin	Maureen Martin	6.79	464	498					
Independent	Desmond Wisley	2.99	204						
Electorate: 9,581 Valid: 6,832 (71.31%) Spoilt: 59 Quota: 977 Turnout: 6,891 (71.92%)

=== Carrick-on-Shannon ===
Carrick-on-Shannon: 6 seats
Party	Candidate	FPv%	Count				
Party	Candidate	FPv%	1	2	3	4	5
Independent	Enda Stenson	15.97	858				
Sinn Féin	Séadhna Logan	12.51	672	694	703	734	749
Independent	Des Guckian	12.49	671	714	727	786	
Fianna Fáil	Seán McGowan	12.27	659	695	707	755	862
Fianna Fáil	Sinéad Guckian	11.30	607	680	696	902	
Fianna Fáil	Siobhán Finnegan-McElgunn	9.92	533	560	572		
Fine Gael	Finola Armstrong-McGuire	9.55	513	595	607	804	
Fine Gael	Thomas Mulligan	9.29	499	565	581	585	597
Fine Gael	John Ward	6.68	359				
Electorate: 8,872 Valid: 5,371 (60.54%) Spoilt: 40 Quota: 768 Turnout: 5,411 (60.99%)

=== Manorhamilton ===
Manorhamilton: 6 seats
Party	Candidate	FPv%	Count					
Party	Candidate	FPv%	1	2	3	4	5	6
Sinn Féin	Padraig Fallon	15.82	940					
Fianna Fáil	Mary Bohan	13.67	812	836	872			
Independent	Felim Gurn	13.16	782	802	840	846	873	
Fine Gael	Frank Dolan	10.30	612	619	636	641	697	838
Fine Gael	Séan McDermott	10.30	612	617	666	668	760	859
Independent	Thomas Kelly	8.35	496	512	573	574	645	721
Fine Gael	Siobhán McGloin	7.42	441	445	470	471		
Fianna Fáil	Justin Warnock	7.41	440	443	512	513	682	789
Fianna Fáil	Pat Munday	7.39	439	444	492	499	515	
Fianna Fáil	Philip Rooney	5.92	352	357				
Independent	James Vincent Kelly	0.25	15	17				
Electorate: 8,865 Valid: 5,941 (67.02%) Spoilt: 70 Quota: 849 Turnout: 6,011 (67.81%)

== Changes ==
=== Co-options ===
Party	Outgoing	LEA	Reason	Date	Co-optee
Sinn Féin	Martin Kenny	Ballinamore	Elected to the 32nd Dáil at the 2016 general election.	14 March 2016	Caroline Gildea
