= 2024 Leitrim County Council election =

Part of the 2024 Irish local elections

- 7 June 2024

All 18 seats on Leitrim County Council 10 seats needed for a majority
	First party	Second party	Third party
Party	Fianna Fáil	Sinn Féin	Fine Gael
Seats won	6	4	3
Seat change	0	▲2	▼3
	Fourth party
Party	Independent
Seats won	5
Seat change	▲1
- Area of Leitrim County Council

An election to all 18 seats on Leitrim County Council was held on 7 June 2024 as part of the 2024 Irish local elections. County Leitrim is divided into 3 local electoral areas (LEAs) to elect councillors for a five-year term of office on the electoral system of proportional representation by means of the single transferable vote (PR-STV).

== Retiring incumbents ==
The following councillors did not seek re-election:

Constituency	Departing Councillor	Party
Carrick-on-Shannon	Finola Armstrong-Maguire	Fine Gael
Manorhamilton	Frank Dolan	Fine Gael
Ballinamore	Gerry Dolan	Independent
Ballinamore	Cailian Ellis	Fianna Fáil
Manorhamilton	Seán McDermott	Fine Gael
Carrick-on-Shannon	Thomas Mulligan	Fine Gael

== Results by party ==
Party	Candidates	Seats	±	First Pref. votes	FPv%	±%
Fianna Fáil	7	6	Steady	5,622	30.04	▼4.35
Sinn Féin	7	4	▲2	4,031	21.54	▲4.36
Fine Gael	5	3	▼3	3,247	17.35	▼7.31
Green	3	0	Steady	501	2.68	▲0.50
Labour	1	0	New	103	0.55	New
Independent Ireland	1	0	New	103	0.55	New
Farmers' Alliance	1	0	New	121	0.55	New
Social Democrats	1	0	New	136	0.73	New
Independent	9	5	▲1	4,849	25.91	▲4.55
Totals	35	18	Steady	18,713	100.00	

=== Analysis by Party ===
Fianna Fáil retained 2 seats in each of the 3 LEAs to remain the largest party in Leitrim with 6 seats overall. Fine Gael had a very bad election here losing 3 seats overall which was not helped by a large number of retirements. The party lost both seats in Manorhamilton to Independent candidates to emerge without any representation and also lost another seat to Sinn Féin in Carrickonshannon. Sinn Féin emerged with 4 seats overall to return to the position they held at the 2014 elections through also the gain of a second seat in Ballinamore and to become the second largest party after Fianna Fáil. Independents increased their numbers to 5.

== Results by LEA ==
*: Outgoing councillor elected in 2019.

=== Ballinamore ===
Ballinamore: 6 seats
Party	Candidate	FPv%	Count							
Party	Candidate	FPv%	1	2	3	4	5	6	7	8
Fianna Fáil	Paddy O'Rourke	21.71%	1,434							
Fine Gael	Enda McGloin	15.64%	1,033							
Sinn Féin	Brendan Barry	13.04%	861	878	913	930	1,007			
Fine Gael	Ita Reynolds-Flynn	10.98%	725	823	840	857	912	917	961	
Fianna Fáil	Gary Prior	8.87%	586	768	776	788	854	862	984	
Sinn Féin	Joanne Curnan	8.51%	562	574	576	584	617	633	681	695
Sinn Féin	Roisín Kenny	7.34%	485	613	613	633	673	687	723	742
Independent	Seán Wynn	6.54%	432	444	459	517	561	576		
Green	Adam Ó Ceallaigh	4.98%	329	347	356	377				
Independent Ireland	Karina Charles Lynch	1.56%	103	118	121					
Independent	George Heslin	0.82%	54	62	62					
Electorate: 10,152 Valid: 6,604 Spoilt: 56 Quota: 944 Turnout: 6,660 (65.60%)

=== Carrick-on-Shannon ===
Carrick-on-Shannon: 6 seats
Party	Candidate	FPv%	Count						
Party	Candidate	FPv%	1	2	3	4	5	6	7
Fianna Fáil	Sean McGowan	13.75%	793	793	797	804	810	812	912
Independent	Enda Stenson	13.25%	764	771	788	863			
Fine Gael	Maeve Reynolds	13.06%	753	757	769	828			
Independent	Des Guckian	12.90%	744	747	778	837			
Fianna Fáil	Paddy Farrell	12.07%	696	702	721	739	750	753	800
Sinn Féin	Cormac Flynn	9.28%	535	538	544	600	608	611	841
Fianna Fáil	Stephen King	9.02%	520	523	524	572	580	582	595
Sinn Féin	Lisa Mulligan	7.18%	414	416	420	460	466	469	
Independent	Sharon Garland	4.16%	240	242	252				
Social Democrats	Lola Gonzalez-Farrell	2.36%	136	152	155				
Farmers' Alliance	Michael McManus	2.10%	121	123					
Green	Leslie O'Hora	0.87%	50						
Electorate: 9,294 Valid: 5,766 Spoilt: 74 Quota: 824 Turnout: 5,840 (62.84%)

=== Manorhamilton ===
Manorhamilton: 6 seats
Party	Candidate	FPv%	Count						
Party	Candidate	FPv%	1	2	3	4	5	6	7
Independent	James Gilmartin	21.04%	1,335						
Fianna Fáil	Mary Bohan	13.16%	835	889	925				
Sinn Féin	Pádraig Fallon	12.28%	779	812	831	862	867	1,145	
Fianna Fáil	Justin Warnock	11.94%	758	797	804	827	830	939	
Independent	Felim Gurn	11.57%	734	846	864	935			
Independent	Eddie Mitchell	8.07%	512	585	655	721	730	774	866
Fine Gael	Kevin Comiskey	7.23%	459	502	513	592	600	612	631
Sinn Féin	Michelle Brennan Shyabo	6.27%	398	425	462	493	496		
Fine Gael	Caitríona Bergin	4.36%	277	303	335				
Green	Bláithín Gallagher	1.92%	122	132					
Labour	Bernie Linnane	1.62%	103	111					
Independent	Diarmuid McConville	0.54%	34	37					
Electorate: 9,614 Valid: 6,346 Spoilt: 47 Quota: 907 Turnout: 6,393 (66.01%)
