= 1920 Leitrim County Council election =

Local election in Ireland

- 31 May 1920

All 19 seats on Leitrim County Council 11 seats needed for a majority
	First party	Second party
Party	Sinn Féin	Ind. Nationalist
Seats won	19	0
- Map showing the area of Leitrim County Council
Council control after election
Sinn Féin

An election to Leitrim County Council took place on 31 May 1920 as part of that year's Irish local elections. 19 councillors were elected from 5 electoral divisions by PR-STV voting for a five-year term of office.

Sinn Féin won every seat for election. The large majority of seats were uncontested, although in Manorhamilton, where seats were contested, Sinn Féin won a massive majority of the votes and as such still secured every seat.

== Results by party ==
Party	Seats	±	First Pref. votes	FPv%	±%
Sinn Féin	19	+19	3,438	91.97	
Ind. Nationalist	0		300	8.03	
Totals	19		3,738	100.00	—

== Results by local electoral area ==
=== Ballinamore ===
Ballinamore - 3 seats
Party	Candidate	FPv%	Count
Party	Candidate	FPv%	1
Sinn Féin	Eugene Deane	Unopposed	Unopposed
Sinn Féin	Malachy Fanning	Unopposed	Unopposed
Sinn Féin	Francis Maguire	Unopposed	Unopposed
Valid: 6,832 (71.31%) Turnout: 6,891 (71.92%)

=== Carrick-on-Shannon ===
Carrick-on-Shannon - 5 seats
Party	Candidate	FPv%	Count
Party	Candidate	FPv%	1
Sinn Féin	Michael Beirne	Unopposed	Unopposed
Sinn Féin	John Costello	Unopposed	Unopposed
Sinn Féin	Francis Dolan	Unopposed	Unopposed
Sinn Féin	Andrew Mooney	Unopposed	Unopposed
Sinn Féin	Con Reynolds	Unopposed	Unopposed
Valid: 6,832 (71.31%) Turnout: 6,891 (71.92%)

=== Carrigallen ===
Carrigallen - 3 seats
Party	Candidate	FPv%	Count
Party	Candidate	FPv%	1
Sinn Féin	John Harte	Unopposed	Unopposed
Sinn Féin	William Murphy	Unopposed	Unopposed
Sinn Féin	James O'Rourke	Unopposed	Unopposed
Valid: 6,832 (71.31%) Turnout: 6,891 (71.92%)

=== Dromahair ===
Dromahair - 4 seats
Party	Candidate	FPv%	Count
Party	Candidate	FPv%	1
Sinn Féin	John Dolan	Unopposed	Unopposed
Sinn Féin	Michael Fox	Unopposed	Unopposed
Sinn Féin	Peter Keany	Unopposed	Unopposed
Sinn Féin	Hugh McPartland	Unopposed	Unopposed
Valid: 6,832 (71.31%) Turnout: 6,891 (71.92%)

=== Manorhamilton ===
Manorhamilton - 4 seats
Party	Candidate	FPv%	Count		
Party	Candidate	FPv%	1	2	3
Sinn Féin	Patrick Fergus		1,490		
Sinn Féin	Patrick McDermott		943		
Sinn Féin	Francis Fox		555	1,094	
Sinn Féin	Thomas Gilgunn		450	632	820
Ind. Nationalist	Bernard Connolly		218	234	238
Ind. Nationalist	Thomas McGovern		82	89	92
Quota: 748 Turnout: 3,738 (?%)
