= County Hall, Carrick-on-Shannon =

Municipal building in County Leitrim, Ireland

- Áras an Chontae, Cora Droma Rúisc
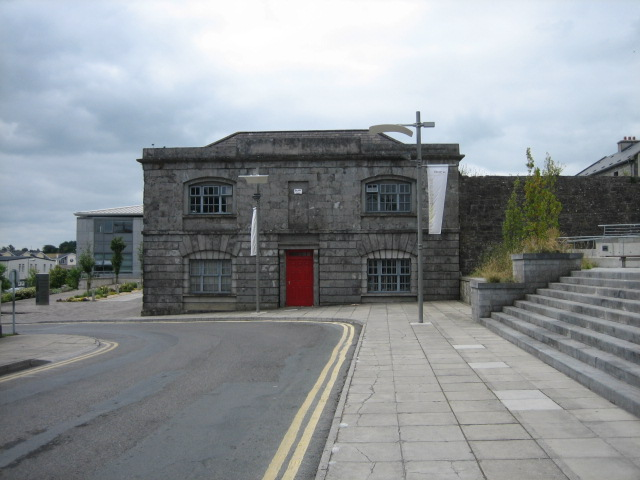
- The former guard building now used by the county council, with modern office facilities behind

- Location within Ireland

General information
- Location: Carrick-on-Shannon, County Leitrim, Ireland
- Coordinates: 53.9444°N 8.0981°W
- Completed: 1810

County Hall (Irish: Áras an Chontae, Cora Droma Rúisc) is a municipal facility at St George's Terrace, Carrick-on-Shannon in County Leitrim, Ireland.

== History ==
The former jail, which was originally a much larger affair, and the prison governor's house, a two-storey rendered building, were both completed in around 1810. Both buildings were acquired by Leitrim County Council in 1902. In 1968, a substantial part of the jail was demolished leaving just the limestone guard building and the prison governor's house. The county council, which had previously been based in the Carrick-on-Shannon Courthouse, moved into the guardhouse, the prison governor's house and some newly built modern office facilities in 1994. The complex was refurbished and further extended in 2017.
