= Carrie Acheson =

Irish politician (1934–2023)

Teachta Dála
- In office June 1981 – February 1982
- Constituency: Tipperary South

Personal details
- Born: Caroline Barlow; 11 September 1934 Clonmel, County Tipperary, Ireland
- Died: 16 January 2023 (aged 88) Waterford, Ireland
- Spouse: Hugh Acheson
- Children: 1
- Relatives: Tras Honan (sister); Dermot Honan (brother-in-law)
- Education: London School of Business Studies

Caroline Acheson (née Barlow; 11 September 1934 – 16 January 2023) was an Irish Fianna Fáil politician who served as a Teachta Dála (TD) for the Tipperary South from 1981 to 1982.

== Career ==
Acheson was born in Clonmel, County Tipperary, in 1934. She was the daughter of Matt Barlow, a Republican activist in the Irish War of Independence. She was educated at the Presentation Convent, Clonmel, the Convent of Mercy, Carlow, and the London School of Business Studies. Acheson worked as a company director in the family business before becoming involved in politics.

Acheson was elected to South Tipperary County Council in 1974. She was elected to Dáil Éireann as a Fianna Fáil TD for the Tipperary South constituency at the 1981 general election, but lost her seat at the following February 1982 election.

Acheson was a sister of former Senator Tras Honan. She was chairperson of the Irish Red Cross Society from 1981 to 1984.

Acheson died on 16 January 2023, at the age of 88.

== See also ==
- Families in the Oireachtas

Dáil	Election	Deputy (Party)	Deputy (Party)	Deputy (Party)	Deputy (Party)
13th	1948	Michael Davern (FF)	Richard Mulcahy (FG)	Dan Breen (FF)	John Timoney (CnaP)
14th	1951	Michael Davern (FF)	Richard Mulcahy (FG)	Dan Breen (FF)	Patrick Crowe (FG)
15th	1954	Michael Davern (FF)	Richard Mulcahy (FG)	Dan Breen (FF)	Patrick Crowe (FG)
16th	1957	Michael Davern (FF)	Richard Mulcahy (FG)	Dan Breen (FF)	Frank Loughman (FF)
17th	1961	Michael Davern (FF)	Patrick Hogan (FG)	Dan Breen (FF)	Seán Treacy (Note: Treacy served as Ceann Comhairle in the 20th Dáil from 1973 to 1977, and was returned automatically at the 1977 election. He lost the Labour party whip in February 1985.) (Lab)
18th	1965	Don Davern (FF)	Patrick Hogan (FG)	Jackie Fahey (FF)	Seán Treacy (Lab)
19th	1969	Noel Davern (FF)	Patrick Hogan (FG)	Jackie Fahey (FF)	Seán Treacy (Lab)
20th	1973	Noel Davern (FF)	Brendan Griffin (FG)	Jackie Fahey (FF)	Seán Treacy (Lab)
21st	1977	Noel Davern (FF)	Brendan Griffin (FG)	3 seats 1977–1981	Seán Treacy (Lab)
22nd	1981	Carrie Acheson (FF)	Brendan Griffin (FG)	Seán McCarthy (FF)	Seán Treacy (Lab)
23rd	1982 (Feb)	Seán Byrne (FF)	Brendan Griffin (FG)	Seán McCarthy (FF)	Seán Treacy (Lab)
24th	1982 (Nov)	Seán Byrne (FF)	Brendan Griffin (FG)	Seán McCarthy (FF)	Seán Treacy (Lab)
25th	1987	Noel Davern (FF)	Brendan Griffin (FG)	Seán McCarthy (FF)	Seán Treacy (Note: Treacy served as Ceann Comhairle in the 25th, 26th and 27th Dáil from 1987 to 1997, and was returned automatically at the 1989 and 1992 elections.) (Ind.)
26th	1989	Noel Davern (FF)	Theresa Ahearn (FG)	Michael Ferris (Lab)	Seán Treacy (Ind.)
27th	1992	Noel Davern (FF)	Theresa Ahearn (FG)	Michael Ferris (Lab)	Seán Treacy (Ind.)
28th	1997	Noel Davern (FF)	Theresa Ahearn (FG)	Michael Ferris (Lab)	3 seats from 1997
28th	2000 by-election	Noel Davern (FF)	Theresa Ahearn (FG)	Séamus Healy (Ind.)	3 seats from 1997
28th	2001 by-election	Noel Davern (FF)	Tom Hayes (FG)	Séamus Healy (Ind.)	3 seats from 1997
29th	2002	Noel Davern (FF)	Tom Hayes (FG)	Séamus Healy (Ind.)	3 seats from 1997
30th	2007	Mattie McGrath (FF)	Tom Hayes (FG)	Martin Mansergh (FF)	3 seats from 1997
31st	2011	Mattie McGrath (Ind.)	Tom Hayes (FG)	Séamus Healy (WUA)	3 seats from 1997
32nd	2016	Constituency abolished. See Tipperary			

Dáil	Election	Deputy (Party)	Deputy (Party)	Deputy (Party)
34th	2024	Mattie McGrath (Ind.)	Michael Murphy (FG)	Séamus Healy (Ind.)
