= Carrick-on-Shannon Courthouse =

The Dock, Carrick-on-Shannon Courthouse
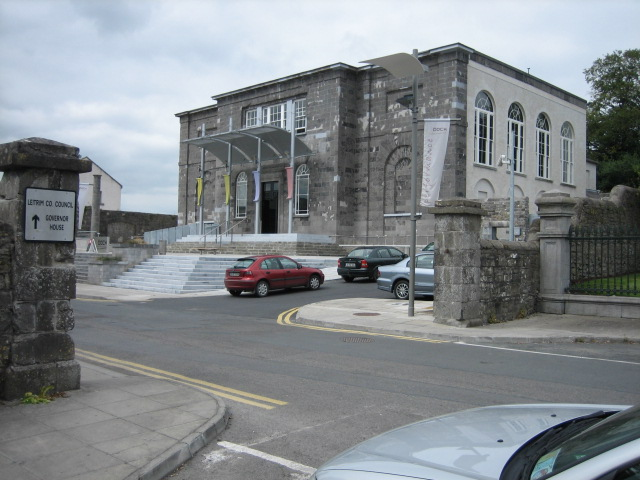
- The Dock, Carrick-on-Shannon Courthouse

- Location within Ireland

General information
- Architectural style: Neoclassical style
- Location: Carrick-on-Shannon, County Leitrim, Ireland
- Coordinates: 53.9449°N 8.0980°W
- Completed: 1822

Design and construction
- Architect: William Farrell

Website
- www.thedock.ie

Carrick-on-Shannon Courthouse is a former judicial facility and now an arts centre known as The Dock in Carrick-on-Shannon, County Leitrim, Ireland.

== History ==
The courthouse, which was designed by William Farrell in the neoclassical style and built in ashlar stone, was completed in 1822. The design involved a symmetrical main frontage with five bays facing onto St Georges Terrace; the central section of three bays, which slightly projected forward, featured a doorway with a stone surround flanked by two round headed windows on the ground floor and a tripartite sash window on the first floor.

The building was originally used as a facility for dispensing justice but, following the implementation of the Local Government (Ireland) Act 1898, which established county councils in every county, it also became the meeting place for Leitrim County Council. After the county council moved to County Hall in 1994, and the courts moved to modern facilities at Caddagh Glebe in 1997, the building fell vacant but was converted for use as arts centre known as The Dock in 2005.
