= Tras Honan =

Irish politician (1930–2023)

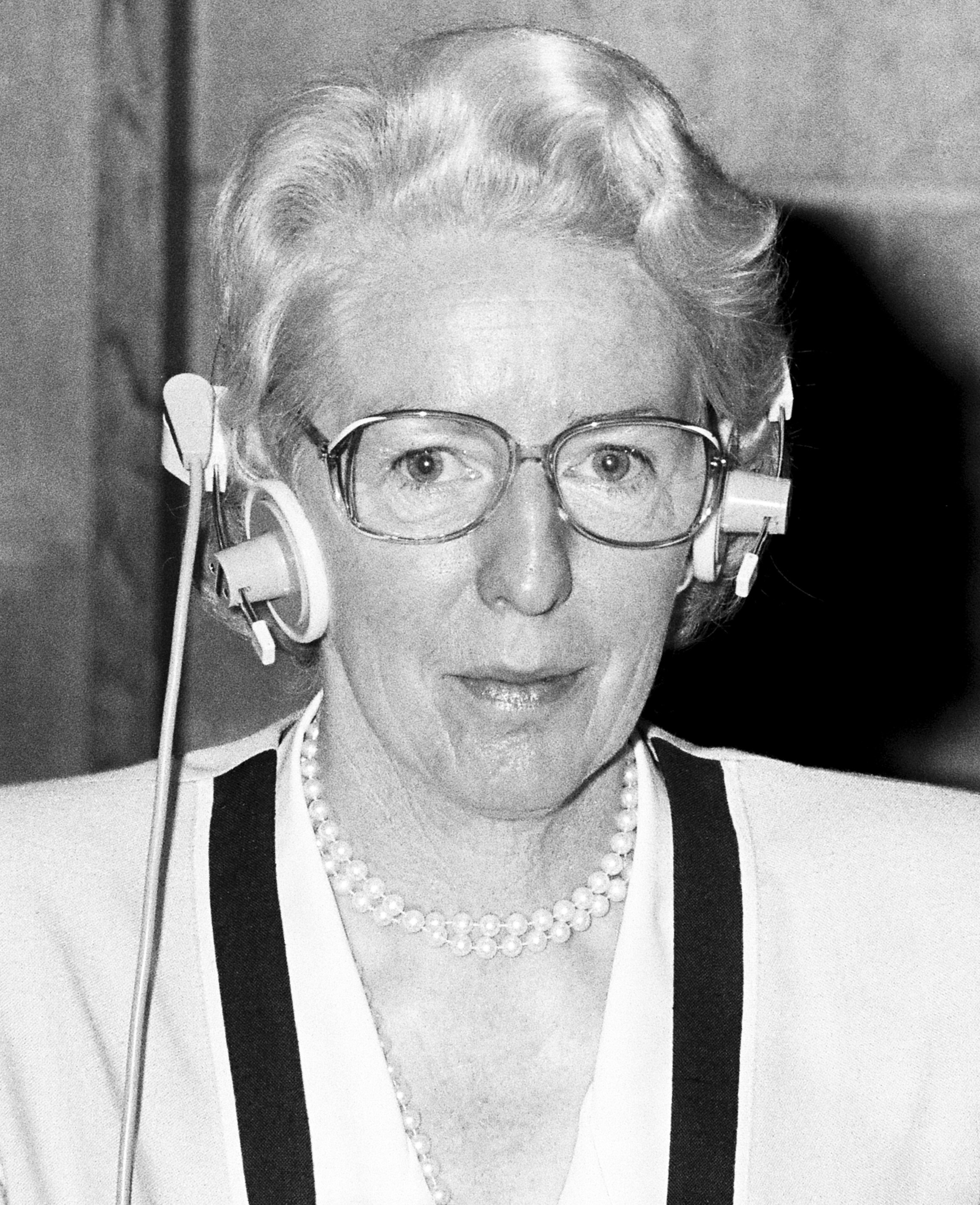
- Honan in 1987

Cathaoirleach of Seanad Éireann
- In office 25 April 1987 – 1 November 1989
- Preceded by: Patrick J. Reynolds
- Succeeded by: Seán Doherty
- In office 13 May 1982 – 23 February 1983
- Preceded by: Charles McDonald
- Succeeded by: Patrick J. Reynolds

Leas-Chathaoirleach of Seanad Éireann
- In office 9 March 1983 – 25 April 1987
- Preceded by: Charles McDonald
- Succeeded by: Charles McDonald

Senator
- In office 27 October 1977 – 17 February 1993
- Constituency: Administrative Panel

Personal details
- Born: Tras Barlow; 4 January 1930 Dublin, Ireland
- Died: 25 November 2023 (aged 93) Waterford, Ireland
- Party: Fianna Fáil
- Spouse: Dermot Honan (m. 1960; died 1986)
- Children: 2
- Relatives: T. V. Honan (father-in-law); Carrie Acheson (sister)

Tras Honan (née Barlow; 4 January 1930 – 25 November 2023) was an Irish Fianna Fáil politician who served as Cathaoirleach of Seanad Éireann from 1982 to 1983, and 1987 to 1992, Leas-Chathaoirleach of Seanad Éireann from 1983 to 1987, and as a Senator for the Administrative Panel from 1977 to 1992. Honan was the first woman and to date the only woman to have held the position of Cathaoirleach (Chair) in the upper house of the Oireachtas.

== Life and career ==
Tras Barlow was born in Dublin on 4 January 1930. She was educated at St. Leo's Convent, Carlow and at the Mercy Convent, Clonmel, County Tipperary. She worked as a housewife and businesswoman before becoming active in politics.

In 1977, she was elected to the 14th Seanad as a Fianna Fáil Senator for the Administrative Panel and served for 15 years until her defeat at the 1993 elections to the 20th Seanad.

In 1982, in the short-lived 16th Seanad, she was elected to the position of Cathaoirleach, the first woman to hold the post. In 1983, in the 17th Seanad, she was elected as Leas-Chathaoirleach (Deputy chair), and in 1987, in the 18th Seanad, she was re-elected as Cathaoirleach.

== Family ==
In 1960, she married Dermot Honan, who was a senator from 1965 to 1975. His father T. V. Honan was also a senator from 1934 to 1954. She was also a sister of Carrie Acheson, a TD.

Tras Honan died on 25 November 2023, at the age of 93.

== See also ==
- Families in the Oireachtas

Oireachtas
Preceded by Charles McDonald	Cathaoirleach of Seanad Éireann; 1982–1983	Succeeded by Patrick J. Reynolds
Preceded by Patrick J. Reynolds	Cathaoirleach of Seanad Éireann; 1987–1989	Succeeded by Seán Doherty
