= National Association of Old IRA =

- 1939 march
- Formation: 1919-01-01

The National Association of Old IRA was a commemorative organisation made up of members of the Old IRA as opposed to the then current IRA, which was as now a proscribed organisation.

They marched in 1939 in a commemoration of the War of Independence.

== Aims ==
As with other veterans organisations, they looked for the welfare of members, organising pensions, etc., and commemorating their fallen and battles and events of significance to membership.
