= T. V. Honan =

Irish politician (1878–1954)

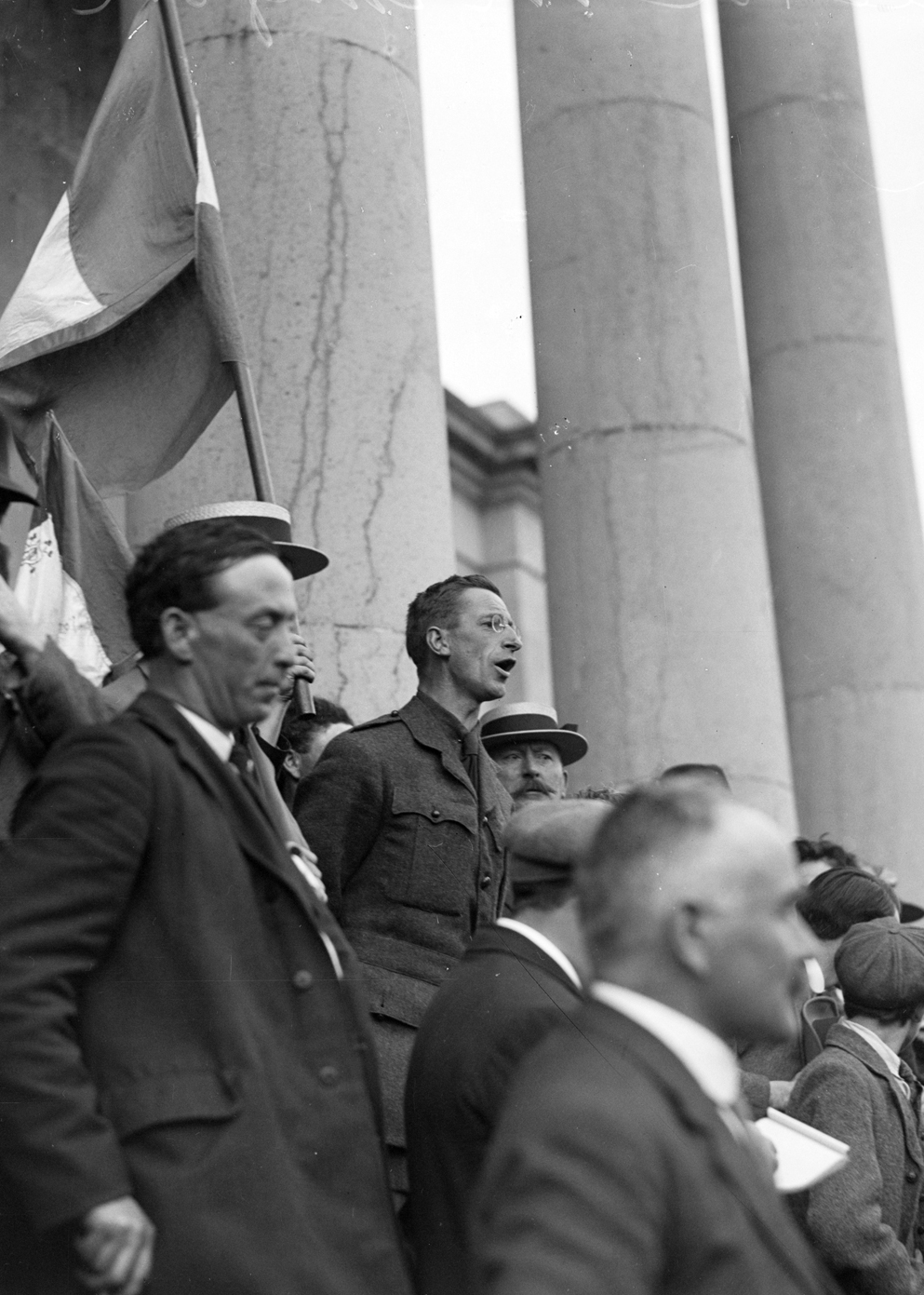
- Honan in 1917

Senator
- In office 21 April 1948 – 14 August 1951
- Constituency: Industrial and Commercial Panel
- In office 14 August 1951 – 22 July 1954
- In office 27 April 1938 – 21 April 1948
- Constituency: Nominated by the Taoiseach

Senator
- In office 12 December 1934 – 29 May 1936

Personal details
- Born: Thomas Vincent Honan; 20 October 1878 County Clare, Ireland
- Died: 21 October 1954 (aged 76) Waterford, Ireland
- Party: Fianna Fáil
- Children: Dermot Honan
- Relatives: Tras Honan (daughter-in-law)
- Profession: Shopkeeper; Politician

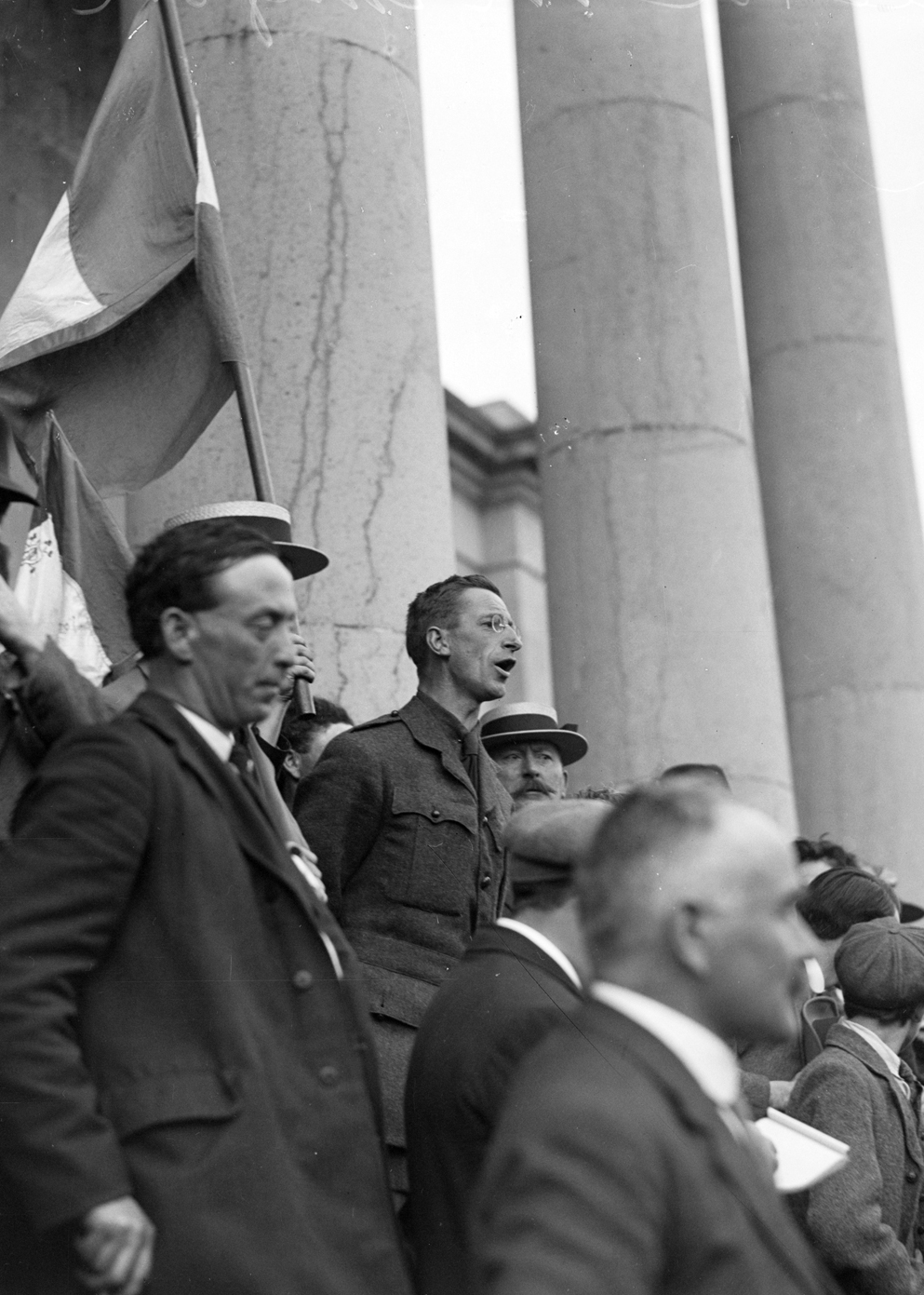
Éamon de Valera addressing crowd outside Ennis Courthouse, with T.V. Honan on his left.

Thomas Vincent Honan (20 October 1878 – 21 October 1954), known as T. V. Honan, was a Sinn Féin activist and later a Fianna Fáil politician in Ireland who served as a senator for 20 years.

He was a shopkeeper who owned a licensed premises in O'Connell Square in Ennis. He was a friend of Éamon de Valera and chaired the gathering at O'Connell Square Ennis in his election campaign (1917), introducing de Valera. His home and premises were shelled and burned by irregular British Army Troops in 1921.

He was elected in 1934 to Seanad Éireann (nominated by de Valera), for the standard nine-year term which applied under the Constitution of the Irish Free State, but his term was cut short when the Free State Seanad was abolished in May 1936. However, the Seanad was re-established under the new Constitution of Ireland which was adopted in 1937, he was nominated by the Taoiseach in 1938 to the 2nd Seanad, and remained in the Senate until he stood down at the 1954 election. For the 6th Seanad from 1948 to 1951, he was elected by the Industrial and Commercial Panel.

His son Dermot was a senator from 1965 to 1973, and Dermot's widow Tras was a senator from 1977 to 1992. She was twice elected as Cathaoirleach.

He died in 1954 and de Valera came to Ennis to lead the funeral procession.

== See also ==
- Families in the Oireachtas
