= Dermot Honan =

Irish politician (died 1986)

Senator
- In office 23 June 1965 – 1 June 1973
- Constituency: Industrial and Commercial Panel

Personal details
- Born: March 1909 County Clare, Ireland
- Died: 20 July 1986 (aged 77) County Clare, Ireland
- Party: Fianna Fáil
- Spouse: Tras Barlow (m. 1960)
- Children: 2
- Parent: T. V. Honan (father)
- Relatives: Carrie Acheson (sister-in-law)

Dermot Patrick Honan (March 1909 – 20 July 1986) was a Fianna Fáil politician from County Clare in Ireland who served as a senator for 8 years.

A licensed vintner before entering politics, he was elected in 1965 to the 11th Seanad Éireann on the Industrial and Commercial Panel, and was re-elected in 1969 to the 12th Seanad. He was defeated in the 1973 Seanad election, but his wife Tras Honan was elected as a senator in 1977, and in a 15-year career in Seanad Éireann she was twice elected as Cathaoirleach. His father T. V. Honan had been a senator from 1934 to 1954.

== See also ==
- Families in the Oireachtas
