= 1932 Irish general election =

Election to the 7th Dáil

- 16 February 1932

153 seats in Dáil Éireann (Note: Including Michael Hayes (CnaG), returned automatically for the National University of Ireland as outgoing Ceann Comhairle, under Art. 21 of the Constitution, as amended by the Constitution (Amendment No. 2) Act 1927, and s. 2 of the Electoral (Amendment) Act 1927.) 77 seats needed for a majority
- Turnout: 76.5% ▲7.5 pp
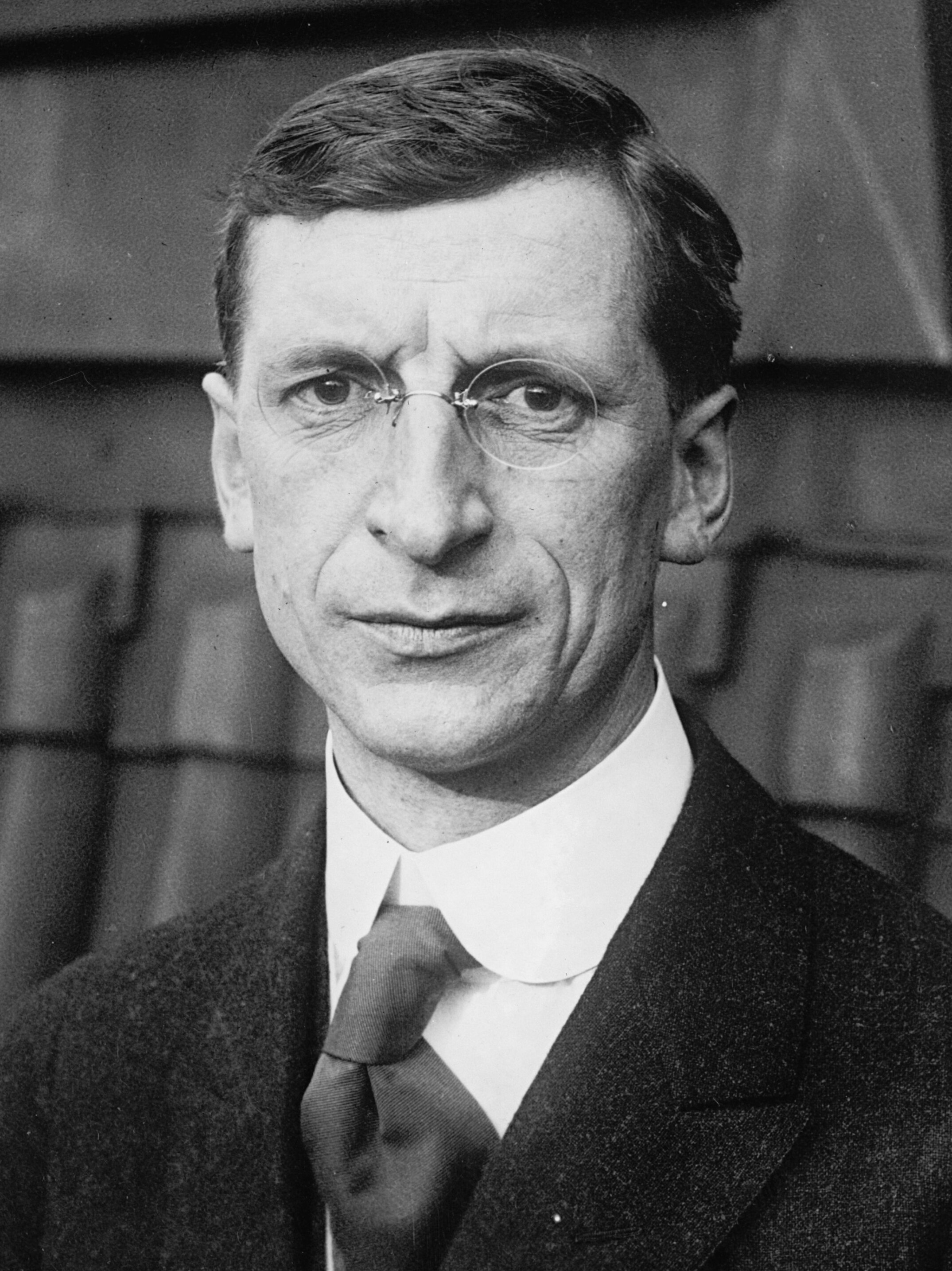

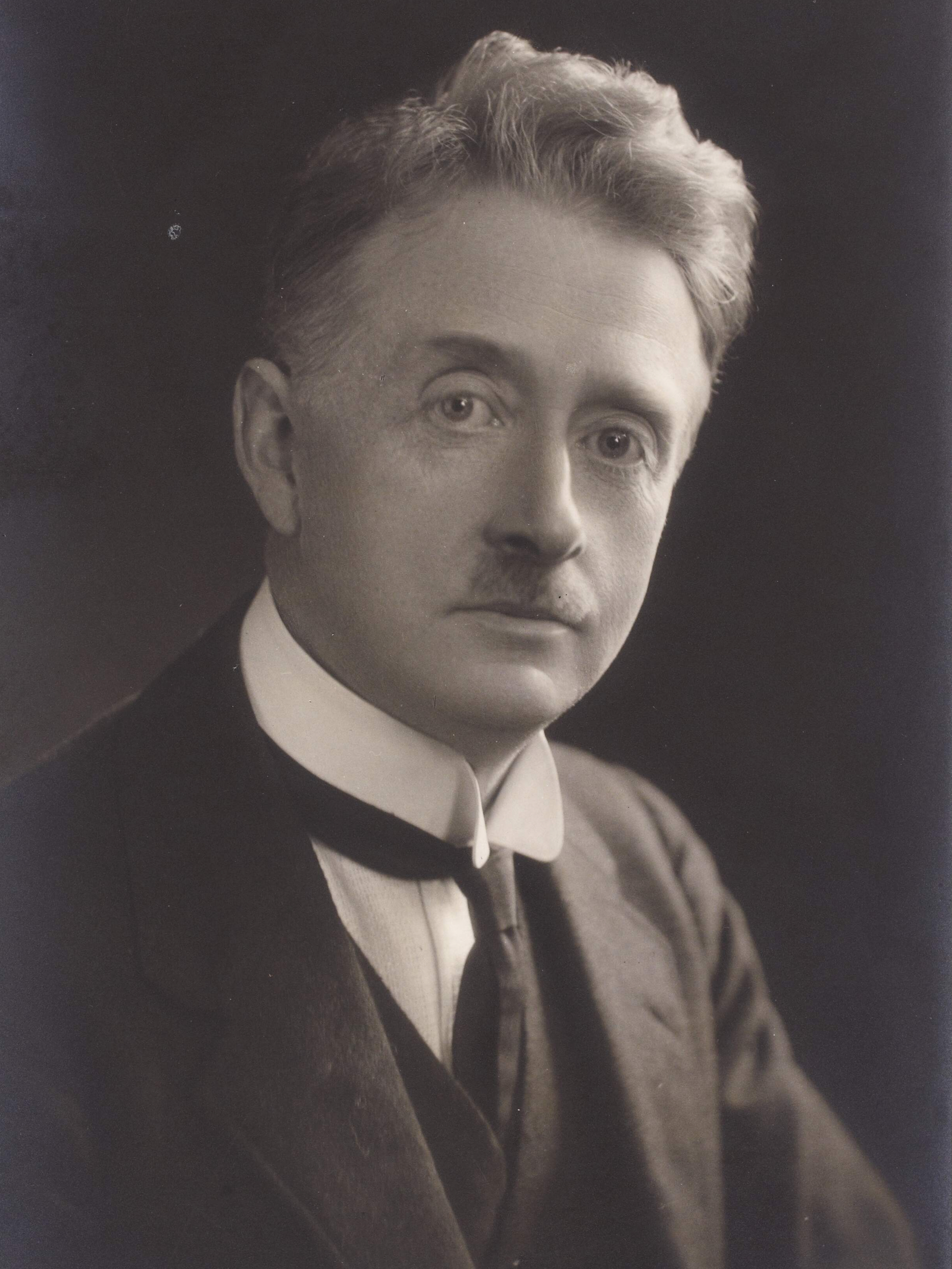

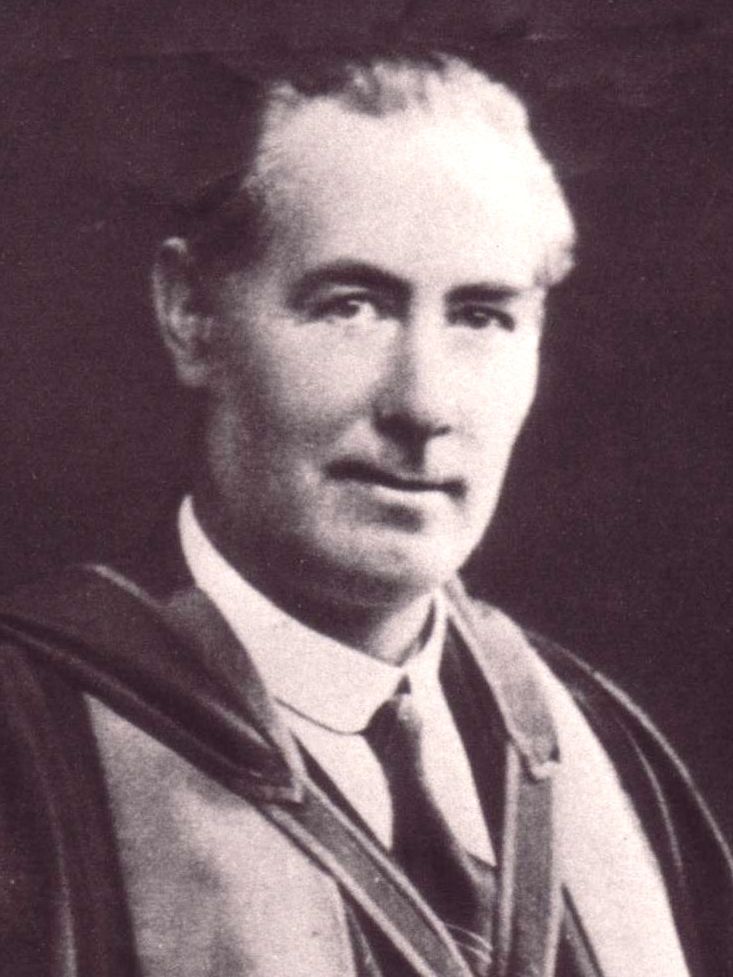
	First party	Second party
Leader	Éamon de Valera	W. T. Cosgrave
Party	Fianna Fáil	Cumann na nGaedheal
Leader since	26 March 1926	April 1923
Leader's seat	Clare	Cork Borough
Last election	57 seats, 35.2%	62 seats, 38.6%
Seats won	72	57
Seat change	▲15	▼5
Popular vote	566,498	449,506
Percentage	44.5%	35.2%
Swing	▲9.3 pp	▼3.4 pp
	Third party	Fourth party
		Farmers'
Leader	Thomas O'Connell
Party	Labour	Farmers' Party
Leader since	1927
Leader's seat	Mayo South (defeated)
Last election	13 seats, 9.1%	6 seats, 6.4%
Seats won	7	3
Seat change	▼6	▼3
Popular vote	98,286	22,899
Percentage	7.7%	1.8%
Swing	▼1.4 pp	▼4.6 pp
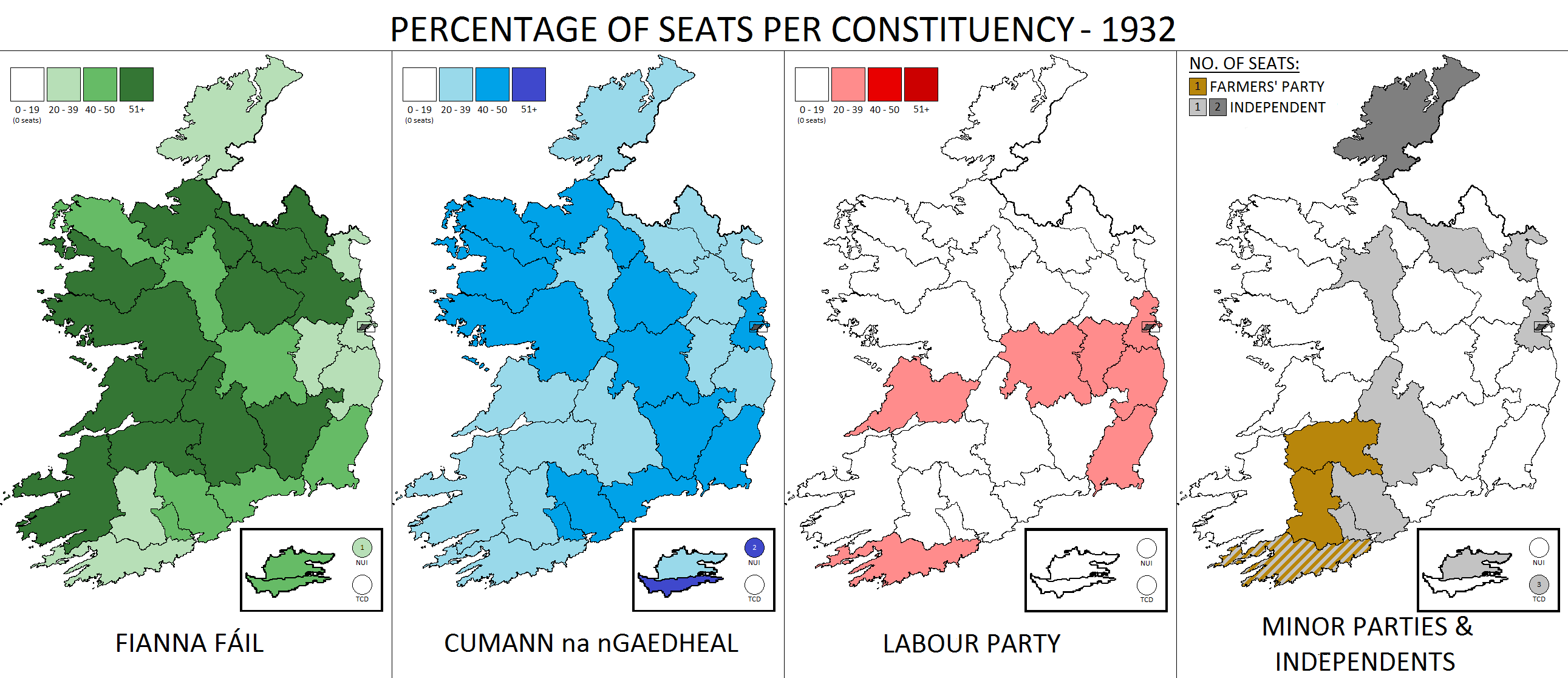
President of the Executive Council before election
W. T. Cosgrave
Cumann na nGaedheal
President of the Executive Council after election
Éamon de Valera
Fianna Fáil

The 1932 Irish general election to the 7th Dáil was held on Tuesday, 16 February, following the dissolution of the 6th Dáil on 29 January by Governor-General James McNeill on the advice of President of the Executive Council W. T. Cosgrave. The general election took place in 30 parliamentary constituencies throughout the Irish Free State for 153 seats in Dáil Éireann. It was the first election held in the Irish Free State since the Statute of Westminster 1931 removed almost all of the authority of the Parliament of the United Kingdom to legislate for the Dominions, including the Irish Free State—effectively granting the Free State internationally recognised independence.

The 7th Dáil met at Leinster House on 9 March to nominate the President and Executive Council of the Irish Free State for appointment by the Governor-General. This resulted in the first change of government in the Irish Free State. Cumann na nGaedheal, which had been the governing party since 1922, was succeeded by Fianna Fáil, which became the largest party in the chamber and formed a government led by Éamon de Valera, with the support of the Labour Party. Fianna Fáil would be the largest party in Dáil Éireann at every general election thereafter until 2011.

== Campaign ==
The election campaign between the two ideologically opposed parties was reasonably peaceful. However, during the campaign, the government prosecuted de Valera's newly established newspaper, The Irish Press. The editor was also brought before a military tribunal. This was seen by many as a major blunder and a serious infringement on freedom of speech. The "red scare" tactics also seemed to backfire on the government.

Two days before the election, Patrick Reynolds, a Cumann na nGaedheal TD was assassinated in Ballinamore. A garda detective was murdered in the same incident. The poll in Leitrim–Sligo was postponed and Reynolds' widow Mary was elected.

=== Cumann na nGaedheal ===
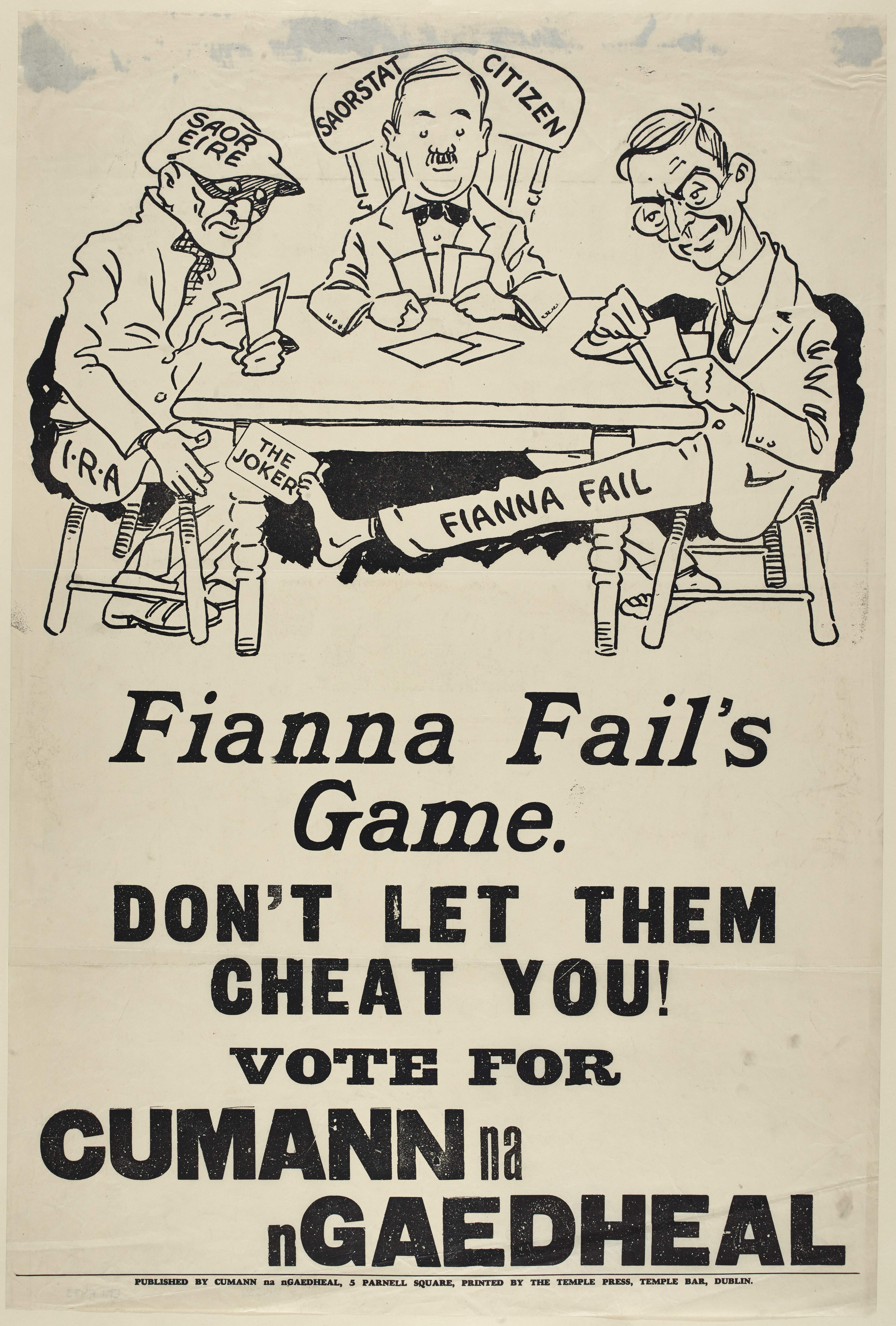
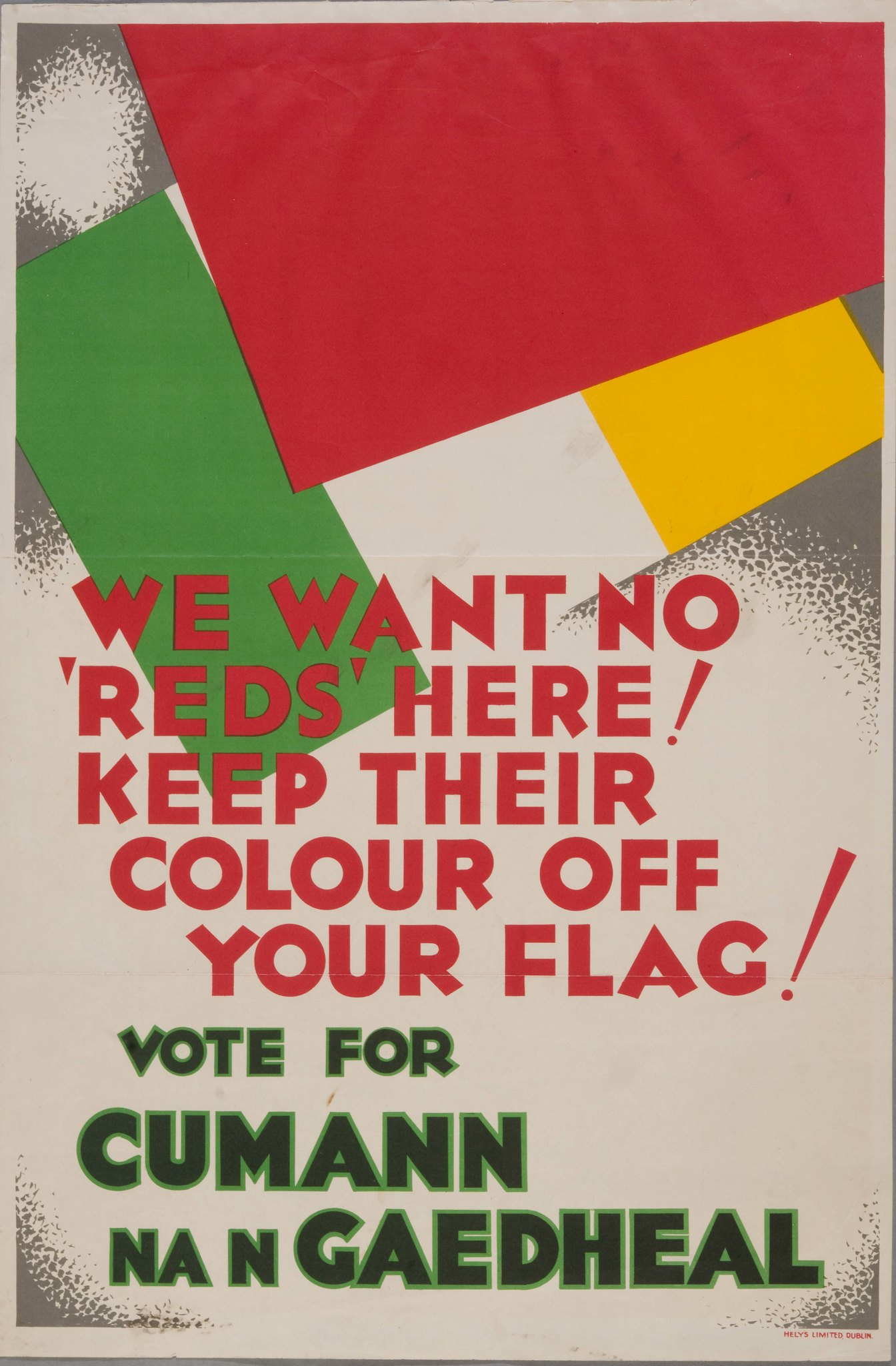
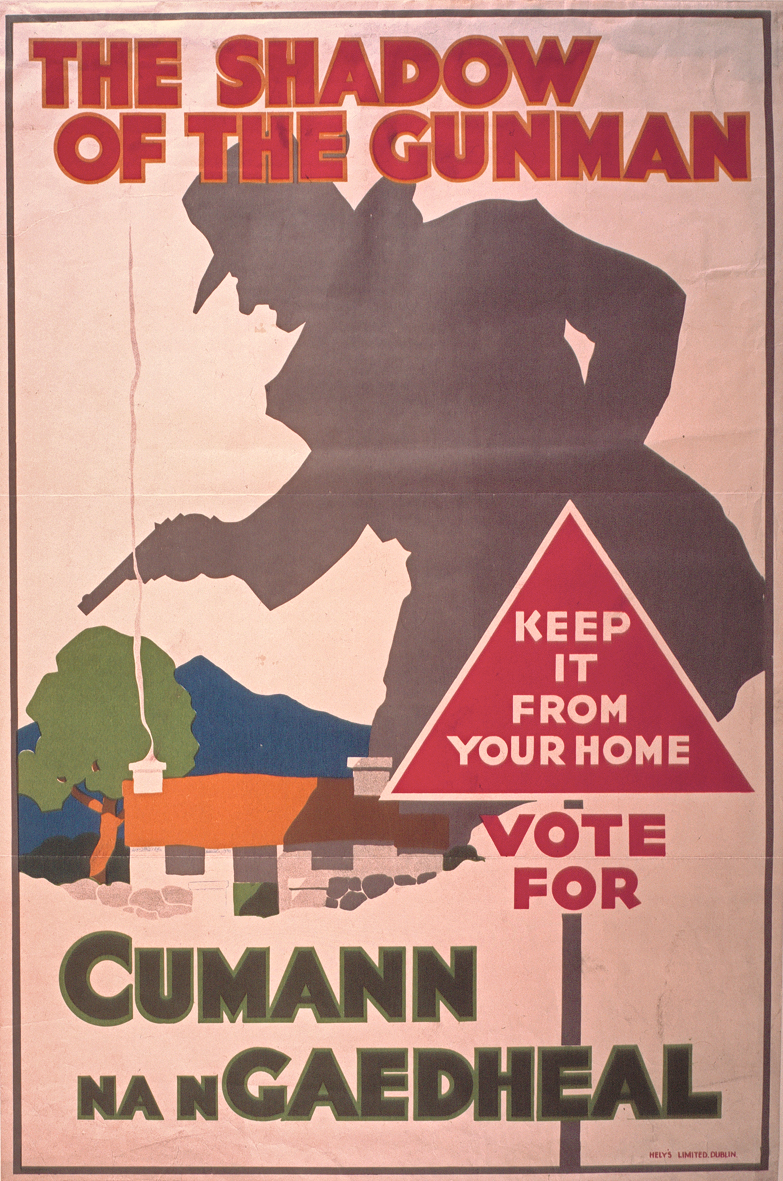
Various Cumann na nGaedheal posters from the campaign. Each poster accuses Fianna Fáil of being linked to radical elements.

Cumann na nGaedheal fought the general election on its record of providing ten years of stable government. The party claimed to have brought stability following the chaos of the Irish Civil War and to have provided honest government. However, by 1932 this provision of solid government was wearing thin, particularly since the party had no solution to the collapse in trade which followed the depression of the early 1930s. Instead of offering new policies, the party believed that its record in government would be enough to retain power. Cumann na nGaedheal also played the "red scare" tactic, describing Fianna Fáil as communists and likening Éamon de Valera to Joseph Stalin.

=== Fianna Fáil ===
In comparison to Cumann na nGaedheal, Fianna Fáil had an elaborate election programme, designed to appeal to a wide section of the electorate. It played down its republicanism to avoid alarm, but provided very popular social and economic policies. The party promised to free IRA prisoners, abolish the Oath of allegiance and reduce the powers of the Governor-General and the Senate. It also promised the introduction of protectionist policies, industrial development, self-sufficiency and improvements in housing and social security benefits.

== Result ==
Election to the 7th Dáil – 16 February 1932
Party	Leader	Seats	±	% of seats	First pref. votes	% FPv	±%
Fianna Fáil	Éamon de Valera	72	+15	47.1	566,498	44.5	+9.3
Cumann na nGaedheal	W. T. Cosgrave	57	−4	37.3	449,506	35.3	−3.4
Labour	Thomas J. O'Connell	7	−6	4.6	98,286	7.7	−1.4
Farmers' Party		3	−3	1.9	22,899	1.8	−4.6
Irish Worker League	James Larkin	0	0	0	3,860	0.3	–0.8
Revolutionary Workers' Groups		0	New	0	1,087	0.1	–
Independent	N/A	14	+2	9.1	131,890	10.4	+2.5
Spoilt votes					20,804	—N/a	—N/a
Total		153	0	100	1,294,830	100	—N/a
Electorate/Turnout					1,695,175	76.5	—N/a

=== Voting summary ===
First preference vote
Fianna Fáil	44.47%
Cumann na nGaedheal	35.28%
Labour	7.71%
Farmers'	1.80%
Others	0.40%
Independent	10.35%

=== Seats summary ===
Dáil seats
Fianna Fáil	47.06%
Cumann na nGaedheal	37.25%
Labour	4.58%
Farmers'	1.96%
Others	0.40%
Independent	9.15%

== Government formation ==
Although Cumann na nGaedheal only lost five seats, the minor parties were decimated. Most of their support bled to Fianna Fáil, leaving it five seats short of an overall majority. Despite this, Fianna Fáil looked like the only party that could realistically form a government. Discussions began immediately after the election and an agreement was reached in which the Labour Party would support Fianna Fáil. The party now had the necessary votes to form a minority government. After the results were announced, newly elected Fianna Fáil TD Seán Moylan proclaimed that the election was a victory of "the owners of the donkey and cart over the pony and trap class".

On 9 March 1932 the first change of government in the Irish Free State took place. Many in the country and abroad wondered if the true test of democracy would be passed. The men who won a civil war only ten years before now had to hand over power to their opponents. Similar to when the party first entered the Dáil in 1927, a number of Fianna Fáil TDs arrived at Leinster House with guns in their pockets. It later emerged that Eoin O'Duffy, Commissioner of the Garda Síochána, had urged a military coup. However, W. T. Cosgrave was determined to adhere to the principles of democracy that he had practised while in government. Likewise, the army, Garda and the civil service all accepted the change of government, despite the fact that they would now be taking orders from men who had been their enemies less than ten years previously. After a brief and uneventful meeting in the Dáil chamber, Éamon de Valera was nominated as President of the Executive Council of the Irish Free State. He was then formally appointed by the Governor-General, James McNeill, who had come to Leinster House to make the appointment rather than require de Valera travel to the Viceregal Lodge, formerly a symbol of British rule. He formed the 6th Executive Council of the Irish Free State. Fianna Fáil, a party led by many of the men most closely identified with opposing the existence of the state ten years earlier, were now the party of government. The 1932 general election was the beginning of a sixteen-year period in government for Fianna Fáil.

== Membership changes ==
=== First time TDs ===
- Brian Brady
- Gerald Bartley
- William Broderick
- William Browne
- Patrick Burke
- Thomas Dowdall
- Francis Gormley
- James Kelly
- Raphael Keyes
- John Kiersey
- Conor Maguire
- Sydney Minch
- Edward Moane
- Patrick Murphy
- Fred McDonogh
- Eugene O'Brien
- Patrick O'Hara
- James Reidy
- Robert Ryan

=== Outgoing TDs ===
- William Aird (Deceased)
- Edmond Carey (Lost seat)
- Michael Connolly (Lost seat)
- Peter de Loughry (Retired)
- William Kent (Lost seat)
- Michael Óg McFadden (Lost seat)
- Arthur Matthews (Lost seat)
- Thomas Mullins (Retired)
- Martin McDonogh (Lost seat)
- Thomas J. O'Connell (Lost seat)
- Patrick O'Dowd (Lost seat)
- Patrick Reynolds (Murdered during campaign)
