= Michael Colreavy =

Irish politician (born 1948)

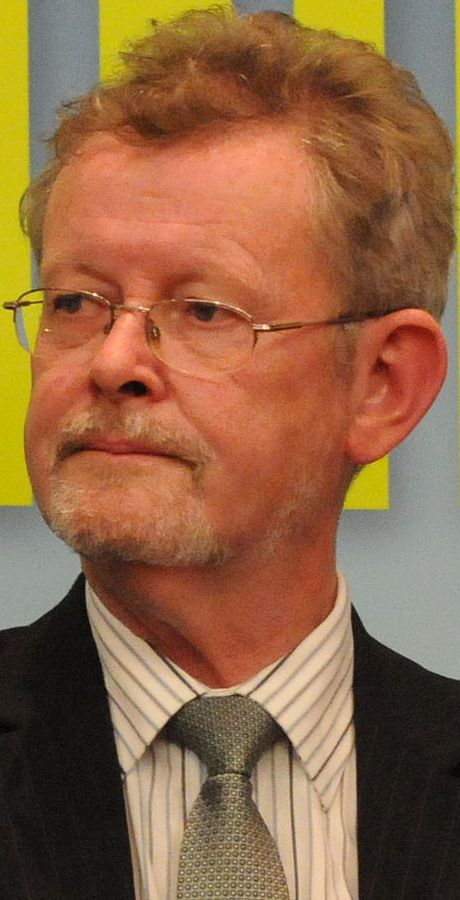
- Colreavy in 2011

Teachta Dála
- In office February 2011 – February 2016
- Constituency: Sligo–North Leitrim

Leitrim County Councillor
- In office June 1999 – February 2011
- Constituency: Manorhamilton

Personal details
- Born: 28 September 1948 (age 77) Sligo, Ireland
- Party: Sinn Féin
- Spouse: Alice Colreavy
- Children: 8

Michael Colreavy (born 28 September 1948) is an Irish former Sinn Féin politician who served as a Teachta Dála (TD) for the Sligo–North Leitrim constituency from 2011 to 2016.

He was the Sinn Féin spokesperson on agriculture, fisheries and food from 2011 to 2016.

Born in Sligo, he moved to Manorhamilton in County Leitrim in 1981 where he now lives. He joined Sinn Féin in 1979 where he campaigned for the hunger striker and Anti H-Block candidate Joe McDonnell at the 1981 general election. He was a branch secretary of the Irish Municipal, Public and Civil Trade Union. He was a member of Leitrim County Council for the Manorhamilton electoral area from 1999 to 2011.

He is an opponent of fracking in the Lough Allen basin, citing environmental concerns.

He did not contest the 2016 general election.

Dáil	Election	Deputy (Party)	Deputy (Party)	Deputy (Party)
30th	2007	Jimmy Devins (FF)	Eamon Scanlon (FF)	John Perry (FG)
31st	2011	Michael Colreavy (SF)	Tony McLoughlin (FG)	John Perry (FG)
32nd	2016	Constituency abolished. See Sligo–Leitrim		
