= Leitrim County Council =

Local authority of County Leitrim, Ireland

Leitrim County Council Comhairle Chontae Liatroma

Type
- Type: County council of County Leitrim

History
- Founded: 1 April 1899

Leadership
- Cathaoirleach: Mary Bohan, FF

Structure
- Seats: 18
- Political groups: Fianna Fáil (6) Sinn Féin (4) Fine Gael (3) Independent (5)

Elections
- Last election: 7 June 2024

Meeting place
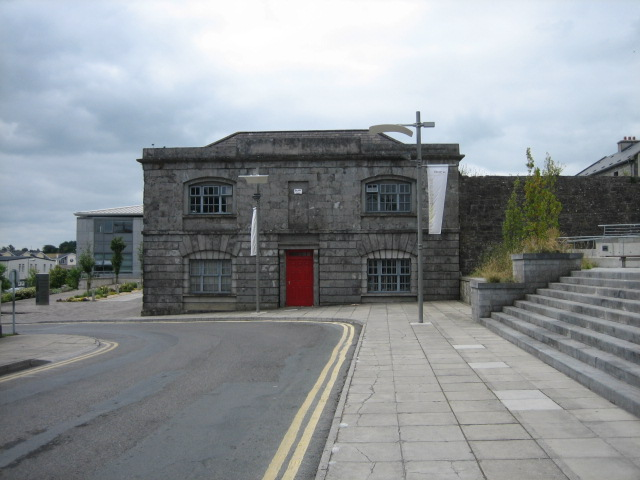
- Áras an Chontae, Carrick-on-Shannon

Website
- Official website

Leitrim County Council (Irish: Comhairle Chontae Liatroma) is the local authority of County Leitrim, Ireland. As a county council, it is governed by the Local Government Act 2001. The council is responsible for housing and community, roads and transportation, urban planning and development, amenity and culture, and environment. The council has 18 elected members. Elections are held every five years and are by single transferable vote. The head of the council has the title of Cathaoirleach (chairperson). The county administration is headed by a chief executive, Joseph Gilhooly. The county town is Carrick-on-Shannon.

== History ==
Leitrim County Council was established on 1 April 1899 under the Local Government (Ireland) Act 1898 for the administrative county of County Leitrim, succeeding the former judicial county of Leitrim.

The county council, which had originally been based in the Carrick-on-Shannon Courthouse, moved to County Hall (Irish: Áras an Chontae) in 1994. In 2016, after the results of the Brexit referendum, the council backed a motion in which it was proposed that the Irish government would put pressure on the British government to facilitate a referendum on a united Ireland within 12 months.

== Regional Assembly ==
Leitrim County Council has two representatives on the Northern and Western Regional Assembly where they are part of the Border Strategic Planning Area Committee.

== Elections ==
The Local Government (Ireland) Act 1919 introduced the electoral system of proportional representation by means of the single transferable vote (PR-STV) for the 1920 Irish local elections. This electoral system has been retained, with the 18 members of Leitrim County Council elected for a five-year term of office from multi-member local electoral areas (LEAs).

Year	FF	FG	SF	IFF	CnaP	CnaT	FP	CnaG	Rep	SF (pre-1922)	IrishNat	Ind.	Total
2024	6	3	4	—N/a	—N/a	—N/a	—N/a	—N/a	—N/a	—N/a	—N/a	5	18
2019	6	6	2	—N/a	—N/a	—N/a	—N/a	—N/a	—N/a	—N/a	—N/a	4	18
2014	6	4	4	—N/a	—N/a	—N/a	—N/a	—N/a	—N/a	—N/a	—N/a	4	18
2009	8	10	2	—N/a	—N/a	—N/a	—N/a	—N/a	—N/a	—N/a	—N/a	2	22
2004	10	8	2	0	—N/a	—N/a	—N/a	—N/a	—N/a	—N/a	—N/a	2	22
1999	10	8	2	0	—N/a	—N/a	—N/a	—N/a	—N/a	—N/a	—N/a	2	22
1991	9	9	1	1	—N/a	—N/a	—N/a	—N/a	—N/a	—N/a	—N/a	2	22
1985	10	8	2	1	—N/a	—N/a	—N/a	—N/a	—N/a	—N/a	—N/a	1	22
1979	10	10	1	0	—N/a	—N/a	—N/a	—N/a	—N/a	—N/a	—N/a	1	22
1974	8	12	1	0	—N/a	—N/a	—N/a	—N/a	—N/a	—N/a	—N/a	1	22
1967	8	11	0	—N/a	—N/a	—N/a	—N/a	—N/a	—N/a	—N/a	—N/a	3	22
1960	5	6	3	—N/a	0	0	—N/a	—N/a	—N/a	—N/a	—N/a	8 (Note: Includes 1 Old IRA.)	22
1955	8	6	0	—N/a	1	0	—N/a	—N/a	—N/a	—N/a	—N/a	7 (Note: Includes 1 Old IRA.)	22
1950	8	5	0	—N/a	1	1	—N/a	—N/a	—N/a	—N/a	—N/a	7	22
1945	8	3	0	—N/a	—N/a	4	—N/a	—N/a	—N/a	—N/a	—N/a	7	22
1942	9	4	0	—N/a	—N/a	0	—N/a	—N/a	—N/a	—N/a	—N/a	9	22
1934	13	11	2	—N/a	—N/a	—N/a	—N/a	—N/a	—N/a	—N/a	—N/a	3	29
1928	8	—N/a	0	—N/a	—N/a	—N/a	0	11	—N/a	—N/a	—N/a	5	24
1925	—N/a	—N/a	—N/a	—N/a	—N/a	—N/a	6	9	8	—N/a	—N/a	6	29
1920	—N/a	—N/a	—N/a	—N/a	—N/a	—N/a	—N/a	—N/a	—N/a	19	0	0	19
1914	—N/a	—N/a	—N/a	—N/a	—N/a	—N/a	—N/a	—N/a	—N/a				19
1911	—N/a	—N/a	—N/a	—N/a	—N/a	—N/a	—N/a	—N/a	—N/a				19
1908	—N/a	—N/a	—N/a	—N/a	—N/a	—N/a	—N/a	—N/a	—N/a				19
1905	—N/a	—N/a	—N/a	—N/a	—N/a	—N/a	—N/a	—N/a	—N/a				19
1902	—N/a	—N/a	—N/a	—N/a	—N/a	—N/a	—N/a	—N/a	—N/a	—N/a			19
1899	—N/a	—N/a	—N/a	—N/a	—N/a	—N/a	—N/a	—N/a	—N/a	—N/a	18	0	18

== Local electoral areas and municipal districts ==
The area governed by the council

County Leitrim is divided into LEAs and municipal districts, defined by electoral divisions.

Municipal District and LEA	Definition	Seats
Ballinamore	Aghacashel, Aghavas, Ballinamore, Barnameenagh, Carrigallen East, Carrigallen West, Castlefore, Cattan, Cloone, Cloverhill, Corrala, Corriga, Drumreilly East, Drumreilly North, Drumreilly South, Drumreilly West, Drumshanbo, Fenagh, Garadice, Gortermone, Greaghglass, Keeldra, Keshcarrigan, Killygar, Kiltubbrid, Lisgillock, Moher, Newtowngore, Oughteragh, Riverstown, Rowan, Stralongford and Yugan.	6
Carrick-on-Shannon	Annaduff, Beihy, Breandrum, Bunnybeg, Carrick-on-Shannon, Cashel, Drumard, Drumdoo, Drumod, Drumsna, Gortnagullion, Gowel, Leitrim, Mohill, Rinn and Roosky.	6
Manorhamilton	Aghalateeve, Aghanlish, Aghavoghil, Arigna, Ballaghameehan, Belhavel, Cloonclare, Cloonlogher, Drumahaire, Drumkeeran, Garvagh, Glenade, Glenaniff, Glenboy, Glencar, Glenfarn, Gubacreeny, Killanummery, Killarga, Kiltyclogher, Kinlough, Lurganboy, Mahanagh, Manorhamilton, Melvin, Munakill, Sramore, St. Patricks and Tullaghan.	6

== Councillors ==
=== 2024 seats summary ===
Party	Seats
Fianna Fáil	6
Sinn Féin	4
Fine Gael	3
Independent	5

=== Councillors by electoral area ===
This list reflects the order in which councillors were elected on 7 June 2024 at the 2024 Leitrim County Council election.

Council members from 2024 election
Local electoral area	Name	Party
Ballinamore	Paddy O'Rourke	Fianna Fáil
Ballinamore	Enda McGloin	Fine Gael
Ballinamore	Brendan Barry	Sinn Féin
Ballinamore	Ita Reynolds Flynn	Fine Gael
Ballinamore	Gary Prior	Fianna Fáil
Ballinamore	Róisín Kenny	Sinn Féin
Carrick-on-Shannon	Enda Stenson	Independent
Carrick-on-Shannon	Maeve Reynolds	Fine Gael
Carrick-on-Shannon	Des Guckian (Note: Replaced during term, see table below for details.)	Independent
Carrick-on-Shannon	Seán McGowan	Fianna Fáil
Carrick-on-Shannon	Paddy Farrell	Fianna Fáil
Carrick-on-Shannon	Cormac Flynn	Sinn Féin
Manorhamilton	James Gilmartin	Independent
Manorhamilton	Mary Bohan	Fianna Fáil
Manorhamilton	Felim Gurn	Independent
Manorhamilton	Pádraig Fallon	Sinn Féin
Manorhamilton	Justin Warnock	Fianna Fáil
Manorhamilton	Eddie Mitchell	Independent

==== Co-options ====
Party	Outgoing	LEA	Reason	Date	Co-optee
Independent	Des Guckian	Carrick-on-Shannon	Resigned due to health issues	6 May 2025	Irene Guckian Rabbitte
