= Gerry Reynolds (Irish politician) =

Irish former politician (born 1961)

Teachta Dála
- In office June 1997 – May 2002
- In office June 1989 – November 1992
- Constituency: Sligo–Leitrim

Senator
- In office 17 February 1993 – 6 June 1997
- In office 25 April 1987 – 15 June 1989
- Constituency: Industrial and Commercial Panel

Leitrim County Councillor
- In office June 2004 – May 2014
- Constituency: Carrick-on-Shannon
- In office June 1985 – June 2004
- Constituency: Ballinamore

Personal details
- Born: 10 April 1961 (age 65) County Leitrim, Ireland
- Party: Fine Gael
- Parent: Patrick J. Reynolds (father)
- Relatives: Patrick Reynolds (grandfather); Mary Reynolds (grandmother)
- Education: Garbally College

Gerard Reynolds (born 10 April 1961) is an Irish former Fine Gael politician from County Leitrim. He was a Senator and later a TD for the Sligo–Leitrim constituency.

== Early life and family ==
Reynolds was born in Ballinamore, County Leitrim, to Patrick J. Reynolds and his wife Tess. He received his secondary education at Garbally College in Ballinasloe, County Galway. His father Patrick was a Fine Gael TD and senator, and his grandfather Patrick Reynolds had been a TD until his assassination during his campaign in the 1932 general election, when his widow Mary Reynolds was elected to succeed him, and held the seat for 25 years.

== Political career ==
Reynolds was elected to Seanad Éireann in 1987 on the Industrial and Commercial Panel, Reynolds was first elected to Dáil Éireann at the 1989 general election. He lost his seat at the 1992 general election to Declan Bree as part of the nationwide swing to Labour and returned to the 20th Seanad, elected again by the Industrial and Commercial Panel. He regained his seat at the 1997 general election but lost it again at the 2002 general election.

He was a member of Leitrim County Council from 1985 to 2014.

== See also ==
- Families in the Oireachtas

Dáil	Election	Deputy (Party)	Deputy (Party)	Deputy (Party)	Deputy (Party)	Deputy (Party)
13th	1948	Eugene Gilbride (FF)	Stephen Flynn (FF)	Bernard Maguire (Ind.)	Mary Reynolds (FG)	Joseph Roddy (FG)
14th	1951	Eugene Gilbride (FF)	Stephen Flynn (FF)	Patrick Rogers (FG)	Mary Reynolds (FG)	Joseph Roddy (FG)
15th	1954	Eugene Gilbride (FF)	Stephen Flynn (FF)	Bernard Maguire (Ind.)	Mary Reynolds (FG)	Joseph Roddy (FG)
16th	1957	Eugene Gilbride (FF)	Stephen Flynn (FF)	John Joe McGirl (SF)	Mary Reynolds (FG)	Patrick Rogers (FG)
16th	1961 by-election	Eugene Gilbride (FF)	Joseph McLoughlin (FG)	John Joe McGirl (SF)	Mary Reynolds (FG)	Patrick Rogers (FG)
17th	1961	Eugene Gilbride (FF)	Joseph McLoughlin (FG)	James Gallagher (FF)	Eugene Gilhawley (FG)	4 seats 1961–1969
18th	1965	Eugene Gilbride (FF)	Joseph McLoughlin (FG)	James Gallagher (FF)	Eugene Gilhawley (FG)	4 seats 1961–1969
19th	1969	Ray MacSharry (FF)	Joseph McLoughlin (FG)	James Gallagher (FF)	3 seats 1969–1981	
20th	1973	Ray MacSharry (FF)	Joseph McLoughlin (FG)	Eugene Gilhawley (FG)	3 seats 1969–1981	
21st	1977	Ray MacSharry (FF)	James Gallagher (FF)	Eugene Gilhawley (FG)	3 seats 1969–1981	
22nd	1981	Ray MacSharry (FF)	John Ellis (FF)	Joe McCartin (FG)	Ted Nealon (FG)	4 seats 1981–2007
23rd	1982 (Feb)	Ray MacSharry (FF)	John Ellis (FF)	Matt Brennan (FF)	Ted Nealon (FG)	4 seats 1981–2007
24th	1982 (Nov)	Ray MacSharry (FF)	Joe McCartin (FG)	Matt Brennan (FF)	Ted Nealon (FG)	4 seats 1981–2007
25th	1987	Ray MacSharry (FF)	John Ellis (FF)	Matt Brennan (FF)	Ted Nealon (FG)	4 seats 1981–2007
26th	1989	Gerry Reynolds (FG)	John Ellis (FF)	Matt Brennan (FF)	Ted Nealon (FG)	4 seats 1981–2007
27th	1992	Declan Bree (Lab)	John Ellis (FF)	Matt Brennan (FF)	Ted Nealon (FG)	4 seats 1981–2007
28th	1997	Gerry Reynolds (FG)	John Ellis (FF)	Matt Brennan (FF)	John Perry (FG)	4 seats 1981–2007
29th	2002	Marian Harkin (Ind.)	John Ellis (FF)	Jimmy Devins (FF)	John Perry (FG)	4 seats 1981–2007
30th	2007	Constituency abolished. See Sligo–North Leitrim and Roscommon–South Leitrim				

Dáil	Election	Deputy (Party)	Deputy (Party)	Deputy (Party)	Deputy (Party)
32nd	2016	Martin Kenny (SF)	Marc MacSharry (FF)	Eamon Scanlon (FF)	Tony McLoughlin (FG)
33rd	2020	Martin Kenny (SF)	Marc MacSharry (FF)	Marian Harkin (Ind.)	Frank Feighan (FG)
34th	2024	Martin Kenny (SF)	Eamon Scanlon (FF)	Marian Harkin (Ind.)	Frank Feighan (FG)
