= Enda Stenson =

Chairman of the Leitrim County Board

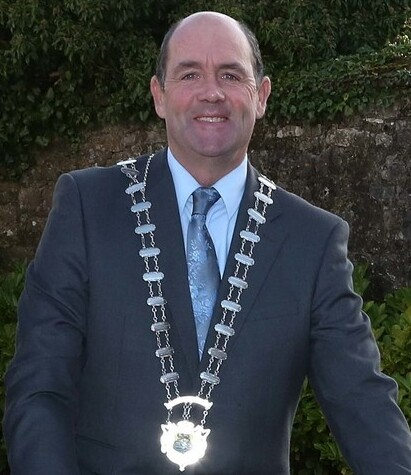
- Stenson in 2013
- Occupation: Chairman of Leitrim GAA
- Years active: 33 as referee
- Known for: 3 Connacht Senior Football Championship finals; 1994 Leitrim Senior Football Championship final

Enda Stenson is a former Gaelic football referee, politician and current chairman of the Leitrim County Board.

== Career ==
Stenson's career as a referee spanned 33 years. In this time he refereed three finals of the Connacht Senior Football Championship.

Stenson also refereed the final of the 1994 Leitrim Senior Football Championship between Allen Gaels and Aughawillan. The game's final play proved contentious as Martin McGowan of Allen Gaels, who was playing with a dislocated spine, stood to take a free. Aughawillan's full-back, Martin Flanagan, took up a position behind his goalkeeper, Martin Prior. McGowan struck the ball and expressed certainty that it was two yards over the bar. However, Aughawillan's Flanagan gave Prior "a bit of a hoosh" and Prior, with his shoulders close to level with the crossbar, caught the ball. Stenson did not penalise the move and then blew the final whistle. Thus Allen Gaels were denied a replay and Aughawillan secured a third consecutive championship title.

Stenson and Flanagan were both present in Croke Park for the 2019 All-Ireland Senior Football Championship Final when Tommy Walsh, the former Australian rules footballer, set himself up to lift 6-foot-4 teammate David Moran in a similar move to deny Dean Rock at the game's conclusion, though the ball did not land near the pair so the move did not occur. Rock's effort went wide and it later emerged that the pair had asked referee David Gough, who had told them he would not penalise the move if they did it.

Stenson became chairman of Leitrim County Board in December 2019. He criticised the prospect of having to play games in other counties while being unable to visit a neighbour due to restrictions imposed during the COVID-19 pandemic. He then publicly criticised Tomás Ó Sé and called on him to resign after Ó Sé questioned the motivations of "weaker counties" after Sligo was forced to withdraw from the 2020 Connacht Senior Football Championship due to an outbreak of COVID in its squad.

Stenson is also an Independent member of Leitrim County Council, on which he represents Carrick-on-Shannon.
