= 2014 Sligo County Council election =

Part of the 2014 Irish local elections

← 2009	23 May 2014	2019 →

All 18 seats on Sligo County Council 10 seats needed for a majority
	First party	Second party	Third party
Party	Fianna Fáil	Fine Gael	Sinn Féin
Seats won	8	3	2
Seat change	+1	-9	+1
	Fourth party	Fifth party	Sixth party
Party	People Before Profit	United Left	Independent
Seats won	1	1	3
Seat change	+1	+1	-
- Area of Sligo County Council

An election to all 18 seats on Sligo County Council took place on 23 May 2014 as part of the 2014 Irish local elections, a reduction from 25 seats at the 2009 election. County Sligo was divided into two local electoral areas (LEAs) to elect councilors for a five-year term of officeon the electoral system of proportional representation by means of the single transferable vote (PR-STV). In addition, the borough council of Sligo was abolished.

Fianna Fáil increased their seats by 1 to 8 seats. Sinn Féin gained 1 seat, as did People Before Profit, and Independents increased their numbers by 1 seat to 4. In contrast, Fine Gael lost 9 seats, being reduced to just 3 councillors, while the Labour Party lost representation on the council for the first time since 1912.

== Results by party ==
Party	Seats	±	1st pref	FPv%	±%
Fianna Fáil	8	+1	9,454	29.7	
Fine Gael	3	-9	7,958	24.9	
Sinn Féin	2	+1	3,290	10.3	
People Before Profit	1	+1	842	2.6	
United Left	1	+1	1,848	5.80	
Labour	0	-2	1,312	4.1	
Independent	3	-	7,142	22.40	
Total	18	-7	31,884	100.00	—

== Results by local electoral area ==
*: Outgoing councillor.

=== Ballymote–Tubbercurry ===
Ballymote–Tubbercurry: 8 seats
Party	Candidate	FPv%	Count								
Party	Candidate	FPv%	1	2	3	4	5	6	7	8	9
Independent	Margaret Gormley	17.84	2,701								
Independent	Michael Clarke	9.92	1,502	1,541	1,644	1,654	1,781				
Fianna Fáil	Martin Baker	9.60	1,454	1,485	1,491	1,521	1,563	1,574	1,585	1,620	1,634
Fianna Fáil	Joe Queenan	7.37	1,116	1,119	1,236	1,238	1,269	1,276	1,281	1,805	
Fine Gael	Gerard Mullaney	7.32	1,108	1,133	1,141	1,204	1,205	1,304	1,304	1,424	1,438
Fianna Fáil	Paul Taylor	7.31	1,107	1,303	1,312	1,344	1,395	1,499	1,502	1,535	1,556
Fianna Fáil	Eamon Scanlon	7.31	1,106	1,260	1,267	1,429	1,506	1,532	1,538	1,595	1,621
Fine Gael	Blair Feeney	7.06	1,069	1,076	1,159	1,171	1,213	1,262	1,280		
Fianna Fáil	Jerry Lundy	6.82	1,032	1,230	1,233	1,255	1,299	1,569	1,575	1,599	1,607
Fine Gael	Dara Mulvey	5.83	883	967	1,001	1,118	1,150	1,284	1,289	1,505	1,544
Sinn Féin	Stephen Edward McCarrick	4.06	614	680	709	717					
Fine Gael	Michael Fleming	3.78	573	691	698	736	753				
Fine Gael	Pat McGrath	2.97	450	510	515						
Independent	Mary Tuffy	2.80	424	461							
Electorate: 22,833 Valid: 15,139 (66.30%) Spoilt: 158 Quota: 1,683 Turnout: 15,297 (67.0%)

=== Sligo ===
Sligo: 10 seats
Party	Candidate	FPv%	Count																
Party	Candidate	FPv%	1	2	3	4	5	6	7	8	9	10	11	12	13	14	15	16	17
United Left	Declan Bree	11.04	1,848																
Sinn Féin	Seán MacManus	9.23	1,545																
Independent	Marie Casserly	7.14	1,195	1,223	1,227	1,228	1,269	1,306	1,371	1,441	1,458	1,563							
Fine Gael	Sinéad Maguire	6.88	1,152	1,163	1,164	1,165	1,176	1,196	1,226	1,278	1,368	1,401	1,549						
Sinn Féin	Tomas Healy	6.75	1,131	1,168	1,170	1,180	1,183	1,195	1,212	1,242	1,245	1,278	1,287	1,325	1,332	1,390	1,394	1,697	
Fianna Fáil	Rosaleen O'Grady	6.50	1,089	1,101	1,102	1,103	1,105	1,114	1,122	1,164	1,216	1,268	1,332	1,463	1,469	1,587			
Fianna Fáil	Tom MacSharry	5.80	971	992	994	995	1,001	1,019	1,032	1,068	1,094	1,122	1,175	1,250	1,255	1,408	1,433	1,519	1,561
People Before Profit	Seamie O'Boyle	5.03	842	907	913	916	922	950	959	1,008	1,015	1,087	1,116	1,205	1,210	1,238	1,240	1,271	1,284
Fianna Fáil	Seamus Kilgannon	4.91	823	829	830	830	836	841	855	869	876	915	954	998	1,001	1,172	1,188	1,237	1,263
Fianna Fáil	Dónal Gilroy	4.51	756	761	762	762	762	767	820	832	842	851	864	885	885				
Fine Gael	Thomas Collery	4.50	753	759	760	760	763	765	786	792	859	873	939	971	976	1,004	1,006		
Labour	Jim McGarry	4.34	726	745	747	749	750	778	785	805	825	857	922	1,049	1,052	1,082	1,086	1,134	1,151
Fine Gael	Hubert Keaney	3.69	618	623	623	623	623	627	709	716	746	771	884	939	945	1,045	1,055	1,273	1,301
Labour	Marcella McGarry	3.50	586	607	609	610	612	659	665	695	726	767	796						
Fine Gael	Matt Lyons	3.19	535	545	545	545	547	553	567	578	663	701							
Independent	Veronica Cawley	2.87	481	507	507	508	516	549	557	587	614								
Fine Gael	David Cawley	2.67	447	460	460	460	463	473	483	498									
Independent	Francis Cadden	2.54	426	443	445	446	459	478	479										
Fine Gael	James Gilmartin	2.21	370	373	373	373	374	377											
Independent	Patricia Gardiner	0.95	159	166	166	166	176												
Independent	Kebba Cham	0.80	134	136	141	141	146												
Independent	Martina Butler	0.72	120	130	133	133													
Fís Nua	James Higgins	0.23	38	39															
Electorate: 30,180 Valid: 16,745 (55.48%) Spoilt: 225 Quota: 1,523 Turnout: 16,970 (56.23%)

== Changes ==
=== Co-options ===
Party	Outgoing	LEA	Reason	Date	Co-optee
People Before Profit	Seamie O'Boyle	Sligo	Death.	August 2015	Gino O'Boyle
Fianna Fáil	Eamon Scanlon	Ballymote–Tubbercurry	Elected to the 32nd Dáil at the 2016 general election.	14 March 2016	Keith Henry
Sinn Féin	Seán MacManus	Sligo	Resignation.	20 February 2017	Chris MacManus
Independent	Margaret Gormley	Ballymote–Tubbercurry	Death.	12 April 2019	None

=== Changes in affiliation ===
Name	LEA	Elected as	New affiliation	Date
Joe Queenan	Ballymote–Tubbercurry	Fianna Fáil	Independent	8 December 2015
