= 1999 Sligo County Council election =

Part of the 1999 Irish local elections

← 1991	10 June 1999	2004 →

All 25 seats to Sligo County Council
	First party	Second party	Third party
Party	Fine Gael	Fianna Fáil	Labour
Seats won	11	9	2
Seat change	-	-2	+1
	Fourth party	Fifth party
Party	Sinn Féin	Independent
Seats won	1	2
Seat change	+1	-
- Map showing the area of Sligo County Council
Council control after election
TBD

An election to Sligo County Council took place on 10 June 1999 as part of that year's Irish local elections. 25 councillors were elected from five local electoral areas for a five-year term of office on the system of proportional representation by means of the single transferable vote (PR-STV).

== Results by party ==
Party	Seats	±	First Pref. votes	FPv%	±%
Fine Gael	11	-	11,849	39.13	
Fianna Fáil	9	-2	10,656	35.19	
Labour	2	+1	2,859	9.44	
Sinn Féin	1	+1	1,206	3.98	
Independent	2	-	3,497	11.55	
Totals	25	-	30,279	100.00	—

== Results by local electoral area ==
=== Ballymote ===
Ballymote - 5 seats
Party	Candidate	FPv%	Count						
Party	Candidate	FPv%	1	2	3	4	5	6	7
Fianna Fáil	Eamon Scanlon*	16.00	991	1,014	1,028	1,053			
Fine Gael	Gerry Murray*	13.25	821	833	847	865	1,173		
Fianna Fáil	Michael Conlon*	12.59	780	784	798	899	946	959	972
Fine Gael	Leo Conlon*	11.48	711	717	738	856	985	1,065	
Fianna Fáil	John Sherlock*	11.28	699	721	798	867	917	927	930
Fine Gael	Michael Rogers	10.73	665	697	723	769			
Independent	Alfie Parke	10.22	633	651	702	793	949	986	1,002
Independent	Thomas Walsh	7.96	493	495	521				
Labour	Michael Lavin	3.86	239	274					
Labour	Tim Mulcahy	2.63	163						
Electorate: 9,009 Valid: 6,195 (68.76%) Spoilt: 70 Quota: 1,033 Turnout: 6,265 (69.54%)

=== Dromore ===
Dromore - 3 seats
Party	Candidate	FPv%	Count			
Party	Candidate	FPv%	1	2	3	4
Fine Gael	Paul Conmy*	23.16	890	951	985	
Fine Gael	Mary Barrett*	23.08	887	1,110		
Independent	Gabriel Healy	19.67	756	874	927	937
Fianna Fáil	Joe Queenan	18.58	714	882	944	951
Fianna Fáil	Michael Clarke	15.51	596			
Electorate: 5,256 Valid: 3,843 (73.12%) Spoilt: 53 Quota: 961 Turnout: 3,896 (74.12%)

=== Sligo Drumcliff ===
Sligo Drumcliff - 6 seats
Party	Candidate	FPv%	Count						
Party	Candidate	FPv%	1	2	3	4	5	6	7
Fine Gael	Joe Leonard*	21.76	1,482						
Fianna Fáil	Dr. Jimmy Devins*	16.50	1,124						
Fianna Fáil	Patsy Barry*	13.55	923	1,127					
Fine Gael	Ita Fox*	9.38	639	719	746	773	835	984	
Labour	Brian Scanlon	8.41	573	583	584	600	708	747	817
Fianna Fáil	Pádraig Branley	7.93	540	562	596	643	706	757	992
Fianna Fáil	Cyril O'Connor	6.14	418	438	447	475	500	552	
Fine Gael	John Peyton	5.84	398	439	450	465	479		
Fine Gael	Barnes Murphy	5.54	377	443	466	478	522	653	738
Labour	John Harrison	4.95	337	402	450	455			
Electorate: 11,084 Valid: 6,811 (61.45%) Spoilt: 155 Quota: 974 Turnout: 6,966 (62.85%)

=== Sligo Strandhill ===
Sligo Strandhill - 7 seats
Party	Candidate	FPv%	Count								
Party	Candidate	FPv%	1	2	3	4	5	6	7	8	9
Fine Gael	Tony McLoughlin*	20.16	1,641								
Labour	Declan Bree*	19.00	1,547								
Sinn Féin	Seán MacManus	14.81	1,206								
Fine Gael	Jim McGarry*	13.08	1,065								
Fine Gael	John Perry	8.12	661	951	1,095						
Fianna Fáil	Albert Higgins	7.90	643	726	802	831	842	851	879	922	1,086
Fianna Fáil	Seamus Kilgannon*	4.97	405	460	510	531	543	551	575	593	691
Fianna Fáil	Michael McDonald	4.78	389	469	518	548	561	566	574	591	
Fianna Fáil	Roddy McGuinn	4.57	372	430	538	593	605	619	638	697	814
Progressive Democrats	Jim Lawlor	1.42	116	153	186	199	212	216			
Progressive Democrats	Tony Clarke	1.18	96	116	185	225	241	248	302		
Electorate: 13,013 Valid: 8,141 (62.56%) Spoilt: 144 Quota: 1,018 Turnout: 8,285 (63.67%)

=== Tobercurry ===
Tobercurry - 4 seats
Party	Candidate	FPv%	Count						
Party	Candidate	FPv%	1	2	3	4	5	6	7
Independent	Margaret Gormley*	22.56	1,193						
Fine Gael	Joe Cawley*	12.80	677	703	753	864	994	1,148	
Fianna Fáil	Aidan Colleary*	11.72	620	627	719	745	875	1,087	
Fianna Fáil	Syl Mulligan*	10.42	551	561	597	689	712		
Fine Gael	Michael Fleming*	10.04	531	553	590	731	841	924	977
Fianna Fáil	Helen Brennan	9.49	502	511	588	604	714	862	899
Independent	Colm O'Donnell	7.98	422	440	512	548			
Fine Gael	Brendan Kivlehan	7.64	404	419	436				
Fianna Fáil	Joe Shannon	7.35	389	417					
Electorate: 6,582 Valid: 5,289 (80.36%) Spoilt: 52 Quota: 1,058 Turnout: 5,341 (81.15%)
