= 1985 Sligo County Council election =

Part of the 1985 Irish local elections

← 1979	20 June 1985	1991 →

All 25 seats on Sligo County Council
	First party	Second party	Third party
Party	Fianna Fáil	Fine Gael	Independent Socialist
Seats won	11	9	1
Seat change	+1	-2	-
	Fourth party	Fifth party
Party	Labour	Independent
Seats won	1	3
Seat change		+1
- Map showing the area of Sligo County Council
Council control after election
TBD

An election to Sligo County Council took place on 20 June 1985 as part of the Irish local elections. 25 councillors were elected from five local electoral areas (LEAs) for a five-year term of office on the electoral system of proportional representation by means of the single transferable vote (PR-STV). This term was extended for a further year, to 1991.

== Results by party ==
Party	Seats	±	First Pref. votes	FPv%	±%
Fianna Fáil	11	+1	12,670	45.60	
Fine Gael	9	-2	10,538	37.93	
Independent Socialist	1	-	1,197	4.31	
Labour	1	-	789	2.84	
Independent	3	+1	2,269	8.17	
Totals	25	-	26,689	100.00	—

== Results by local electoral area ==
=== Ballymote ===
Ballymote: 7 seats
Party	Candidate	FPv%	Count									
Party	Candidate	FPv%	1	2	3	4	5	6	7	8	9	10
Fine Gael	Tommy Lavin*		943	950	1,056							
Fine Gael	Leo Conlon*		908	917	944	956	1,144					
Independent	Patrick Carty		749	775	779	780	806	809	813	913	944	968
Fianna Fáil	Tommy Deignan*		712	715	719	720	785	802	890	960	1,059	
Fianna Fáil	Michael Conlon*		632	635	636	676	670	698	725	762	801	816
Fianna Fáil	John Sherlock		608	690	698	699	707	708	740	855	886	901
Fine Gael	Tony McLoughlin*		607	625	639	645	699	750	753	904	1,096	
Fianna Fáil	Joe Shannon*		565	568	574	577	580	580	736	828	971	988
Fianna Fáil	Josie Devaney		548	554	559	560	564	568	608			
Fianna Fáil	Eamon Scanlon		495	498	524	530	535	535				
Fine Gael	Eddie Cogan		411	413	433	437						
Fine Gael	John Perry		378	389	442	461	504	543	707	726		
Fine Gael	Neil Henry		270	278								
Independent	Kevin Lee		180									
Electorate: 10,372 Valid: 8,006 (77.82%) Spoilt: 65 Quota: 1,001 Turnout: 8,071

=== Dromore ===
Dromore: 4 seats
Party	Candidate	FPv%	Count			
Party	Candidate	FPv%	1	2	3	4
Fine Gael	Paul Conmy*		1,236			
Fianna Fáil	Paddy Conway*		952			
Fianna Fáil	Seamus O'Dowd		780	886	917	
Fianna Fáil	Syl Mulligan		575	584	595	700
Fine Gael	Peter Kivlehan*		512	647	650	1,021
Fine Gael	Sean Tempany		531	545	548	
Electorate: 6,186 Valid: 4,518 (73.84%) Spoilt: 50 Quota: 904 Turnout: 4,568

=== Drumcliffe ===
Drumcliffe: 5 seats
Party	Candidate	FPv%	Count										
Party	Candidate	FPv%	1	2	3	4	5	6	7	8	9	10	11
Fianna Fáil	Sen. Willie Farrell*		927	927	935	975							
Fine Gael	Joe Leonard		747	751	768	791	794	796	927	951			
Fine Gael	Ita Fox*		695	700	723	728	777	777	819	854	898	1,193	
Fianna Fáil	John Mulrooney*		556	558	561	574	638	646	662	692	815	861	881
Independent	Michael Carroll		509	511	520	537	542	544	551	678	699	748	823
Fianna Fáil	Danny McHugh		443	445	457	466	509	510	521	555	683	726	754
Fine Gael	Matt Lyons*		391	393	403	406	409	410	442	477	500		
Fianna Fáil	Kevin Gilbride		324	327	329	335	356	361	380	394			
Labour	Stephen McDonagh		269	280	309	326	334	335	354				
Fine Gael	John Watters		256	256	259	303	305	313					
Fianna Fáil	Jackie McGowan		204	205	205	206							
Independent Socialist	John Harrison		175	191	200								
Labour	Anne Gilmartin		121	129									
Independent Socialist	Pat Fallon		62										
Electorate: 9,142 Valid: 5,679 (63.5%) Spoilt: 126 Quota: 947 Turnout: 5,805

=== Sligo ===
Sligo: 5 seats
Party	Candidate	FPv%	Count							
Party	Candidate	FPv%	1	2	3	4	5	6	7	8
Independent Socialist	Declan Bree*		960							
Fianna Fáil	Seán McManus*		847							
Fine Gael	Peter Henry		451	468	472	564	585	616	943	
Fianna Fáil	Hugh Glynn		412	429	441	451	475	572	617	648
Labour	Tommy Higgins*		399	444	449	468	573	622	682	779
Fine Gael	Imelda Allingham		387	399	401	474	494	506		
Fianna Fáil	Bill Monaghan		365	389	410	428	478	652	684	712
Fianna Fáil	Roddy McGuinn		355	373	384	390	434			
Sinn Féin	Seán MacManus		321	349	351	357				
Fine Gael	Paul Dunleavy		223	236	238					
Electorate: 7,969 Valid: 4,720 (60.48%) Spoilt: 100 Quota: 787 Turnout: 4,820

=== Tubbercurry ===
Tubbercurry: 4 seats
Party	Candidate	FPv%	Count				
Party	Candidate	FPv%	1	2	3	4	5
Fianna Fáil	Matt Brennan TD*		1,090				
Independent	Margaret Gormley*		831	845	912	940	1,011
Fine Gael	Joe Cawley*		710	741	756	824	1,094
Fianna Fáil	Aidan Colleary		645	685	756	942	1,030
Fine Gael	Gerry Murray*		503	505	618	629	691
Fine Gael	Tommy O'Hara		447	452	455	526	
Fianna Fáil	Patrick Walsh		331	345	386		
Fianna Fáil	Robert Taylor		304	315			
Electorate: 5,914 Valid: 4,861 (82.97%) Spoilt: 46 Quota: 973 Turnout: 4,907
