= 2019 Sligo County Council election =

Part of the 2019 Irish local elections

← 2014	24 May 2019	2024 →

All 18 seats on Sligo County Council 10 seats needed for a majority
	First party	Second party	Third party
Party	Fine Gael	Fianna Fáil	Sinn Féin
Seats won	6	5	2
Seat change	▲3	▼3	Steady
	Fourth party	Fifth party	Sixth party
Party	People Before Profit	Inds. 4 Change	Independent
Seats won	1	1	3
Seat change	Steady	▲1	Steady
- Results by local electoral area

An election to all 18 seats on Sligo County Council was held on 24 May 2019 as part of the 2019 Irish local elections. County Sligo was divided into 3 local electoral areas (LEAs) to elect councillors for a five-year term of office on the electoral system of proportional representation by means of the single transferable vote (PR-STV).

== Boundary review ==
At the 2014 Sligo County Council election, County Sligo was divided into two local electoral areas, both of which breached upper limit of 7 seats in the terms of reference of the 2018 LEA boundary review. Following its recommendations, the boundaries were redrawn to create three LEAs.

== Overview ==
A total of 35 candidates contested the county's 18 seats, of whom fifteen were outgoing councillors. Fianna Fáil and Fine Gael each had nine candidates. Sinn Féin had three, Solidarity/People Before Profit had two, while and one each for the Labour Party, Green Party and Renua. The nine independent candidates included Declan Bree, who was County Sligo's longest serving councillor. Thirteen of the fifteen candidates who were outgoing councillors were re-elected, including Bree who was first elected in 1974 to both the County Council and Sligo Borough Council.

Several seats were decided by very narrow margins, and result was that Fine Gael gained three seats to become the largest party, with six seats. Fianna Fáil lost three seats, and the other group totals were unchanged. The long-serving Bree was re-elected in the Sligo–Strandhill LEA.

== Results by party ==
Party	Seats	±	1st pref	FPv%	±%
Fine Gael	6	▲3	10,171	30.30	▲5.40
Fianna Fáil	5	▼3	9,599	28.59	▼1.11
Sinn Féin	2	Steady	2,752	8.20	▼2.10
People Before Profit	1	Steady	1,332	3.97	▲1.37
Inds. 4 Change	1	▲1	1,550	4.62	New
Labour	0	Steady	470	1.40	▼2.70
Renua	0	Steady	315	0.94	New
Green	0	Steady	175	0.52	▲0.52
United Left	0	▼1	N/A	N/A	N/A
Independent	3	Steady	7,187	21.41	▼0.99
Total	18	Steady	33,571	100.00	Steady

== Results by local electoral area ==
*: Outgoing councillor elected in 2014.
†: Outgoing councillor coopted subsequent to the 2014 election.

=== Ballymote–Tubbercurry ===
Ballymote–Tubbercurry: 7 seats
Party	Candidate	FPv%	Count									
Party	Candidate	FPv%	1	2	3	4	5	6	7	8	9	10
Fianna Fáil	Paul Taylor	11.80%	1,886	1,900	2,076							
Independent	Joe Queenan	10.86%	1,737	1,763	1,773	1,775	1,806	1,822	2,158			
Independent	Michael Clarke	9.77%	1,562	1,603	1,614	1,615	1,664	1,693	2,076			
Fine Gael	Gerard Mullaney	9.53%	1,523	1,551	1,556	1,557	1,565	1,635	1,747	1,798	1,819	1,853
Fine Gael	Dara Mulvey	9.36%	1,497	1,538	1,583	1,584	1,624	1,931	2,062			
Fianna Fáil	Martin Baker	8.96%	1,432	1,472	1,510	1,521	1,535	1,793	1,821	1,869	1,895	1,902
Fine Gael	Blair Feeney	7.54%	1,206	1,219	1,221	1,221	1,227	1,241				
Independent	Willie Gormley	6.54%	1,046	1,098	1,175	1,186	1,455	1,743	1,786	1,804	1,821	1,826
Fianna Fáil	Keith Henry	6.39%	1,022	1,050	1,092	1,109	1,146					
Fine Gael	Martin Connolly	6.32%	1,011	1,019	1,193	1,214	1,732	1,783	1,868	1,893	1,906	1,923
Independent	Barry Gallagher	5.93%	948	998	1,097	1,109						
Fianna Fáil	Romuald Mullarkey	4.33%	692	699								
Sinn Féin	Daniel Gallagher	2.66%	425									
Electorate: 24,389 Valid: 15,989 Spoilt: 198 Quota: 1,999 Turnout: 16,187 (66.37%)

The Fine Gael director of elections made a formal complaint about the large increase in the number of postal votes cast — 252 compared to 131 in the same district in the 2014 election and 20 and 17 in the other two districts in 2019. The ensuing Garda investigation into potential electoral fraud was still ongoing in February 2022.

=== Sligo–Drumcliff ===
Sligo–Drumcliff: 5 seats
Party	Candidate	FPv%	Count						
Party	Candidate	FPv%	1	2	3	4	5	6	7
Sinn Féin	Thomas Healy	15.11%	1,370	1,402	1,437	1,610			
Fianna Fáil	Dónal Gilroy	13.87%	1,257	1,279	1,322	1,435	1,450	1,534	
Fine Gael	Thomas Walsh	13.46%	1,220	1,236	1,252	1,322	1,339	1,613	
Independent	Marie Casserly	12.94%	1,173	1,211	1,250	1,460	1,504	1,688	
Fine Gael	Tom Fox	11.45%	1,038	1,049	1,060	1,112	1,116	1,320	1,375
Fianna Fáil	Seamus Kilgannon	10.20%	925	941	964	1,052	1,063	1,168	1,217
Fine Gael	Ciara McLoughlin	9.27%	840	857	873	926	934		
People Before Profit	Nigel Gallagher	4.78%	433	475	491				
Fianna Fáil	Colm McGurran	3.66%	332	333	348				
Independent	Amanda Gallagher	2.84%	257	267					
Inds. 4 Change	Corey Whyte	2.23%	202						
Electorate: 16,154 Valid: 9,065 Spoilt: 127 Quota: 1,511 Turnout: 9,192 (56.9%)

=== Sligo–Strandhill ===
Sligo–Strandhill: 6 seats
Party	Candidate	FPv%	Count					
Party	Candidate	FPv%	1	2	3	4	5	6
Inds. 4 Change	Declan Bree	15.83%	1,348					
Fianna Fáil	Tom Macsharry	12.23%	1,042	1,053	1,125	1,140		
Fianna Fáil	Rosaleen O'Grady	11.87%	1,011	1,016	1,057	1,069	1,145	1,217
Sinn Féin	Chris MacManus (Note: See change below.)	11.24%	957	967	988	1,012	1,099	1,167
Fine Gael	Blaine Gaffney	10.81%	921	926	958	971	1,016	1,100
Fine Gael	Sinead Maguire	10.74%	915	942	976	984	1,022	1,203
People Before Profit	Gino O'Boyle	10.56%	899	925	944	976	1,061	1,164
Labour	Nessa Cosgrove	5.52%	470	537	567	583	606	
Independent	Jim McGarry	5.45%	464	470	495	506		
Renua	Finbarr Filan	3.70%	315	320				
Green	Miranda O'Donnell	2.05%	175					
Electorate: 16,754 Valid: 8,517 Spoilt: 133 Quota: 1,217 Turnout: 8,650 (51.63%)

== Results by gender ==
2019 Sligo County Council election Candidates by gender
Gender	Number of candidates	% of candidates	Elected councillors	% of councillors
Men	29	87.9%	15	83.3%
Women	4	12.1%	3	16.7%
TOTAL	33		18	

== Changes after 2019 ==
=== Co-options ===
Party	Outgoing	LEA	Reason	Date	Co-optee
Sinn Féin	Chris MacManus	Sligo–Strandhill	Replaced Matt Carthy in the European Parliament	March 2020	Arthur Gibbons
