= 1979 Sligo County Council election =

Part of the 1991 Irish local elections

← 1974	7 June 1979	1985 →

All 24 seats on Sligo County Council
	First party	Second party	Third party
Party	Fine Gael	Fianna Fáil	Labour
Seats won	11	10	1
	Fourth party
Party	Independent
Seats won	2
- Map showing the area of Sligo County Council
Council control after election
TBD

An election to Sligo County Council took place on 7 June 1979 as part of that year's Irish local elections. 24 councillors were elected from four local electoral areas (LEAs) for a six-year term of office on the electoral system of proportional representation by means of the single transferable vote (PR-STV).

== Results by party ==
Party	Seats	First Pref. votes	FPv%
Fine Gael	11	11,724	42.8%
Fianna Fáil	10	11,164	40.7%
Labour	1	650	2.4%
Sinn Féin	0	540	2.0%
Sinn Féin The Workers' Party	0	167	0.6%
Independent	2	3,161	11.5%
Totals	24	27,406	100.0%

== Results by local electoral area ==
=== Ballymote ===
Ballymote: 7 seats
Party	Candidate	FPv%	Count							
Party	Candidate	FPv%	1	2	3	4	5	6	7	8
Fine Gael	Tommy Lavin*	12.6%	930							
Fianna Fáil	Joe Shannon*	11.4%	843	859	860	911	935			
Fianna Fáil	Michael Conlan*	10.4%	767	773	773	779	791	873	923	
Fianna Fáil	Tommy Deignan*	9.9%	727	731	732	748	774	831	954	
Fine Gael	Gerry Murray*	9.7%	714	728	729	742	800	822	831	844
Independent	William Gormley*	8.7%	639	655	656	699	735	794	860	872
Fine Gael	John Higgins	7.8%	574	593	594	614	710	745	774	779
Fine Gael	Leo Conlon*	7.7%	568	588	589	599	635	763	801	806
Fine Gael	Michael Kelly	4.7%	347	370	370	410	431	—		
Fine Gael	Neil Henry	4.7%	344	375	377	395	—			
Fianna Fáil	Kevin Savage	4.4%	328	412	412	513	530	556	—	
Independent	Abina McMorrow	4.2%	307	350	350	—				
Fine Gael	Kevin Lee	3.9%	289	—						
Electorate: 9,400 Valid: 7,377 (78.48%) Quota: 923

Source for Ballymote counts.

=== Dromore ===
Dromore: 4 seats
Party	Candidate	FPv%	Count						
Party	Candidate	FPv%	1	2	3	4	5	6	7
Fianna Fáil	Paddy Conway*	26.6%	1,065						
Fine Gael	Paul Conmy*	16.2%	648	692	713	744	816		
Fianna Fáil	George Finnerty*	12.4%	496	605	622	643	681	681	809
Fine Gael	Peter Barrett*	11.3%	454	467	470	493	640	652	718
Independent	Patrick O'Neill	9.6%	386	406	420	449	482	484	—
Fianna Fáil	Patrick Hallinan	9.1%	363	411	418	483	496	497	593
Fianna Fáil	Sean Tempany	7.2%	289	298	300	338	—		
Sinn Féin	Jack McElduff	5.6%	225	234	240	—			
Independent	Michael Maloney	1.9%	76	88	—				
Valid: 4,002 Quota: 801

Source for Dromore counts.

=== Sligo ===
Sligo: 9 seats
Party	Candidate	FPv%	Count													
Party	Candidate	FPv%	1	2	3	4	5	6	7	8	9	10	11	12	13	14
Fianna Fáil	Sean McManus*	12.4%	1,201													
Fianna Fáil	John Mulrooney*	10.1%	1,065													
Independent	Declan Bree* (Note: Member of the Sligo–Leitrim Independent Socialist Organisation ran as an Independent)	9.7%	1,154	1,182	1,206											
Fine Gael	Tony McLoughlin*	9.4%	1,116	1,141	1,163	1,175	1,176	1,177	1,201							
Fine Gael	Tom Fox*	7.0%	826	837	844	858	858	859	879	912	935	970	1,001	1,054	1,097	1,111
Fine Gael	Eugene Henry*	6.7%	798	811	823	827	829	829	837	902	921	976	1,021	1,062	1,114	1,120
Fine Gael	John Fallon*	5.8%	691	715	733	737	743	743	751	780	793	808	834	939	1,002	1,018
Fianna Fáil	William Farrell*	5.6%	669	708	711	731	731	736	742	747	771	847	964	985	1,250	
Fine Gael	James Feighney	5.1%	600	601	602	636	636	638	639	659	674	836	848	862	879	884
Fianna Fáil	Michael Brennan	7.0%	826	837	844	858	858	859	879	912	935	970	1,001	1,054	1,097	1,111
Independent	Michael Carroll	4.0%	472	482	490	498	500	500	515	523	556	561	573	—		
Labour	Tommy Higgins*	4.8%	574	611	613	621	621	622	632	637	652	658	776	802	—	
Fianna Fáil	Albert Higgins	3.7%	439	490	493	496	497	499	505	508	523	525	—			
Fine Gael	John Watters	3.2%	379	381	382	392	393	394	402	424	444	—				
Fine Gael	P.J. Kearney	2.7%	315	323	324	332	333	333	337	343	—					
Fine Gael	Matt Lyons	1.8%	216	221	222	224	224	224	236	—						
Fine Gael	Dympna McNamara	1.6%	195	202	204	213	214	214	—							
Sinn Féin The Workers' Party	Michael Leydon	1.4%	167	168	168	—										
Independent	Sidney Gallagher	1.1%	133	133	—											
Valid: 11,869 Quota: 1,187

Source for Sligo counts.

=== Tubbercurry ===
Tubbercurry: 4 seats
Party	Candidate	FPv%	Count		
Party	Candidate	FPv%	1	2	3
Fianna Fáil	Matt Brennan*	24.9%	1,035		
Fianna Fáil	Paddy Marren*	20.1%	837		
Fine Gael	Peter Kivlehan*	18.5%	771	821	879
Fine Gael	Joe Cawley*	15.5%	643	696	783
Fine Gael	Luke Colleran	12.7%	527	541	590
Fianna Fáil	Eugene Owens	8.3%	345	431	—
Valid: 4,158 Quota: 823

Source for Tubbercurry counts.
