= 2009 Sligo County Council election =

Part of the 2009 Irish local elections

← 2004	5 June 2009	2014 →

All 25 seats on Sligo County Council
	First party	Second party	Third party
Party	Fine Gael	Fianna Fáil	Labour
Seats won	12	7	2
Seat change	+2	-3	-1
	Fourth party	Fifth party
Party	Sinn Féin	Independent
Seats won	1	3
Seat change	-	+2
- Map showing the area of Sligo County Council
Council control after election
TBD

An election to Sligo County Council took place on 5 June 2009 as part of that year's Irish local elections. 25 councillors were elected from five local electoral areas (LEAs) for a five-year term of office on the electoral system of proportional representation by means of the single transferable vote (PR-STV).

== Results by party ==
Party	Seats	±	First Pref. votes	FPv%	±%
Fine Gael	12	+2	13,413	39.36	
Fianna Fáil	7	-3	8,972	26.33	
Labour	2	-1	2,500	7.34	
Sinn Féin	1	-	2,709	7.95	
Independent	3	+2	6,484	19.03	
Totals	25	-	34,078	100.00	—

== Results by local electoral area ==
=== Ballymote ===
Ballymote - 4 seats
Party	Candidate	FPv%	Count					
Party	Candidate	FPv%	1	2	3	4	5	6
Fine Gael	Gerard Mullaney*	24.35	1,437					
Fianna Fáil	Martin Baker*	18.86	1,113	1,208				
Fine Gael	Thomas Collery	12.08	713	784	796	870	880	1,119
Fine Gael	Pat McGrath*	12.08	713	762	785	994	999	1,106
Sinn Féin	Thomas Healy	10.93	644	659	665	765	768	
Fianna Fáil	Mattie Scanlon	10.39	613	625	644	766	775	915
Independent	Tim Mulcahy	9.18	542	554	606			
Independent	Dick Cahill	2.13	126	129				
Electorate: 8,628 Valid: 5,902 (68.41%) Spoilt: 76 Quota: 1,181 Turnout: 5,964 (69.12%)

=== Dromore ===
Dromore - 4 seats
Party	Candidate	FPv%	Count				
Party	Candidate	FPv%	1	2	3	4	5
Independent	Michael Clarke	21.94	1,408				
Fianna Fáil	Joe Queenan*	16.31	1,047	1,062	1,229	1,298	
Fine Gael	Mary Barrett*	15.88	1,019	1,060	1,144	1,253	1,390
Fine Gael	Dara Mulvey	12.42	797	802	832	856	1,298
Fine Gael	Paul Conmy*	11.14	715	726	749	809	856
Labour	Alwyn Love	10.38	666	674	702	779	
Sinn Féin	Padraig Hallinan	6.25	401	430	454		
Fianna Fáil	Martin Wilson	5.69	356	380			
Electorate: 8,963 Valid: 6,418 (71.61%) Spoilt: 56 Quota: 1,284 Turnout: 6,474 (72.23%)

=== Sligo Drumcliff ===
Sligo Drumcliff - 6 seats
Party	Candidate	FPv%	Count					
Party	Candidate	FPv%	1	2	3	4	5	6
Fine Gael	Joe Leonard*	19.77	1,527					
Labour	Veronica Cawley*	13.57	1,048	1,085	1,091	1,149		
Fianna Fáil	Jude Devins*	10.91	843	860	861	878	926	1,001
Fianna Fáil	Seamus Kilgannon*	9.18	709	722	724	741	811	852
Fianna Fáil	Patsy Barry*	9.15	707	796	805	966	983	1,028
Fine Gael	Hubert Keaney	8.28	640	695	701	761	923	1,023
Sinn Féin	Arthur Gibbons	8.03	620	647	650	697	733	
Fine Gael	Matt Lyons	7.31	565	638	639	687	873	1,016
Fine Gael	Ita Fox*	6.96	538	574	575	607		
Independent	James Gilmartin	5.11	474	546	566			
Independent	Francis Feeney	0.70	54	58				
Electorate: 12,947 Valid: 7,725 (59.67%) Spoilt: 97 Quota: 1,097 Turnout: 7,822 (60.42%)

=== Sligo Strandhill ===
Sligo Strandhill - 7 seats
Party	Candidate	FPv%	Count					
Party	Candidate	FPv%	1	2	3	4	5	6
Fine Gael	Tony McLoughlin*	24.86	2,019					
Independent	Declan Bree*	16.82	1,366					
Sinn Féin	Seán MacManus*	12.86	1,044					
Fianna Fáil	Deirdre Healy-McGowan	9.99	811	915	922	930	939	981
Fine Gael	Imelda Henry*	8.40	682	966	977	1,008	1,016	1,176
Fianna Fáil	Rosaleen O'Grady	7.30	593	567	578	587	598	607
Labour	Jim McGarry*	6.14	499	940	973	1,004	1,028	1,067
Fianna Fáil	Albert Higgins*	5.44	442	835	840	846	853	883
Fine Gael	David Cawley	4.65	378	440	447	456	468	498
Labour	Mary Dolan-McLoughlin	3.53	287	360	364	375	379	
Electorate: 13,517 Valid: 8,121 (60.08%) Spoilt: 105 Quota: 1,065 Turnout: 8,226 (60.86%)

=== Tobercurry ===
Tobercurry - 4 seats
Party	Candidate	FPv%	Count		
Party	Candidate	FPv%	1	2	3
Independent	Margaret Gormley*	36.50	2,162		
Fianna Fáil	Jerry Lundy*	16.37	970	1,157	1,266
Fine Gael	Gerry Murray*	15.26	904	1,211	
Fianna Fáil	Aidan Colleary*	12.96	768	890	960
Fine Gael	Michael Fleming*	12.93	766	985	1,169
Independent	Roger McCarrick	5.98	354	496	
Electorate: 8,294 Valid: 5,924 (71.43%) Spoilt: 58 Quota: 1,185 Turnout: 5,982 (72.12%)
