= 2024 Sligo County Council election =

Part of the 2024 Irish local elections

- 7 June 2024

All 18 seats on Sligo County Council 10 seats needed for a majority
	First party	Second party	Third party
Party	Fianna Fáil	Fine Gael	Sinn Féin
Last election	5	6	2
Seats won	6	4	2
Seat change	▲1	▼2	Steady
	Fourth party	Fifth party	Sixth party
Party	People Before Profit	Labour	Independent
Last election	1	0	4
Seats won	1	1	4
Seat change	Steady	▲1	Steady
- Results by Local Electoral Area

An election to all 18 seats on Sligo County Council was held on 7 June 2024 as part of the 2024 Irish local elections. County Sligo is divided into 3 local electoral areas (LEAs) to elect councillors for a five-year term of office on the electoral system of proportional representation by means of the single transferable vote (PR-STV).

== Retiring incumbents ==
The following councillors were not seeking re-election:

Constituency	Departing Councillor	Party
Ballymote–Tubbercurry	Martin Baker	Fianna Fáil
Sligo–Strandhill	Sinead Maguire	Fine Gael
Sligo–Strandhill	Rosaleen O'Grady	Fianna Fáil

== Results by party ==
Party	Candidates	Seats	±	1st pref	FPv%	±%
Fianna Fáil	8	6	▲1	9,859	29.18	▲0.59
Fine Gael	7	4	▼2	8,403	24.87	▼5.43
Sinn Féin	6	2	Steady	4,701	13.92	▲5.72
People Before Profit	2	1	Steady	940	2.78	▼1.19
Labour	1	1	▲1	841	2.49	▲1.09
Irish Freedom	2		New	894	2.65	New
Green	2			439	1.30	▲0.78
The Irish People	2		New	296	0.88	New
Aontú	1		New	186	0.55	New
Independent	8	4	Steady	7,224	21.38	▼4.51
Total	39	18	Steady	33,783	100.00	

=== Analysis of Election ===
Fianna Fáil supplanted Fine Gael as the largest party in Sligo by gaining a seat at their expense in each of the Ballymote-Tubbercurry and the Sligo-Drumcliff LEAs. The party did lose a seat, however, in Sligo-Strandhill with the retirement of long-serving Rosaleen O'Grady to the Labour Party who regained a presence on the Council after an absence of 10 years.

== Results by local electoral area ==
*: Outgoing councillor elected in 2019.
†: Outgoing councillor coopted subsequent to the 2019 election.

=== Ballymote–Tubbercurry ===
Ballymote–Tubbercurry: 7 seats
Party	Candidate	FPv%	Count											
Party	Candidate	FPv%	1	2	3	4	5	6	7	8	9	10	11	12
Fianna Fáil	Paul Taylor	11.9	1,924	1,928	1,939	1,959	1,989	2,024						
Independent	Michael Clarke	11.0	1,773	1,785	1,790	1,814	1,975	2,128						
Fine Gael	Gerry Mullaney	10.7	1,724	1,733	1,766	1,772	1,787	1,808	1,810	1,910	1,969	2,130		
Fine Gael	Dara Mulvey	10.3	1,666	1,678	1,696	1,712	1,759	1,818	1,829	1,913	1,972	2,401		
Independent	Joe Queenan	9.4	1,523	1,533	1,535	1,537	1,639	1,727	1,774	2,368				
Fianna Fáil	Liam Brennan	8.1	1,307	1,309	1,349	1,356	1,382	1,414	1,420	1,451	1,512	1,765	1,944	2,001
Fianna Fáil	Barry Gallagher	7.7	1,246	1,250	1,250	1,298	1,319	1,346	1,354	1,364	1,388	1,508	1,556	1,569
Fine Gael	Martin Connolly	6.9	1,110	1,114	1,114	1,157	1,173	1,190	1,190	1,276	1,318	1,397	1,454	1,477
Fianna Fáil	Keith Henry	6.6	1,060	1,069	1,072	1,086	1,107	1,134	1,136	1,152	1,177			
Fine Gael	Patrick Cleary	6.2	1,004	1,007	1,009	1,009	1,027	1,067	1,081					
Irish Freedom	James Conway	3.7	596	598	605	632								
Sinn Féin	Jennifer van Aswegen	2.4	383	458	550	767	830							
Sinn Féin	Jason Gorman	2.1	345	356	446									
Sinn Féin	Donal O'Connor	1.9	302	321										
PBP–Solidarity	Emma Hendrick	1.3	203											
Electorate: 26,024 Valid: 16,166 Spoilt: 111 Quota: 2,021 Turnout: 16,277 (62.55%)

=== Sligo–Drumcliff ===
Sligo–Drumcliff: 5 seats
Party	Candidate	FPv%	Count					
Party	Candidate	FPv%	1	2	3	4	5	6
Fine Gael	Thomas Walsh	20.3	1,891					
Sinn Féin	Thomas Healy	15.6	1,449	1,538	1,801			
Independent	Marie Casserly	15.1	1,405	1,451	1,764			
Fianna Fáil	Edel McSharry	14.3	1,327	1,394	1,550	1,627		
Fianna Fáil	Donal Gilroy	12.5	1,163	1,179	1,243	1,262	1,328	1,346
Fine Gael	Tom Fox	10.8	1,008	1,099	1,190	1,227	1,300	1,324
Independent	Colm McGurran	4.5	421	441				
Irish Freedom	Amanda Gallagher	3.2	298	302				
Green	Agnieszka Piwowarczyk	2.4	226	233				
The Irish People	Rob De Salle	1.2	114	114				
Electorate: 16,973 Valid: 9,302 Spoilt: 70 Quota: 1,551 Turnout: 9,372 (55.22%)

=== Sligo–Strandhill ===
Sligo–Strandhill: 6 seats
Party	Candidate	FPv%	Count									
Party	Candidate	FPv%	1	2	3	4	5	6	7	8	9	10
Independent	Declan Bree	18.5	1,537									
Fianna Fáil	Tom MacSharry	16.5	1,374									
Fine Gael	Fergal Nealon	13.9	1,158	1,197								
Labour	Nessa Cosgrove	10.1	841	902	932	951	954	960	1,084	1,116	1,146	1,310
Sinn Féin	Arthur Gibbons	8.9	741	790	804	811	812	822	830	856	1,094	1,145
PBP–Solidarity	Gino O'Boyle	8.9	737	815	848	863	864	902	931	968	1,025	1,103
Fianna Fáil	Seamus Kilgannon	5.5	458	479	536	558	559	568	590	617	626	
Independent	Finbar Filan	4.9	406	445	471	506	508	538	554	623	642	776
Sinn Féin	Pauline Donnelly	3.9	323	346	350	353	353	364	370	379		
Green	Johnny Gogan	2.6	213	227	232	243	243	249				
Aontú	Graham Monaghan	2.2	186	193	200	216	217	260	264			
The Irish People	Michael Kelly	2.2	182	189	194	211	211					
Independent	Jim Lawlor	1.5	127	136	141							
Independent	Diarmuid Mac Conville	0.4	32	34	34							
Electorate: 17,646 Valid: 8,315 Spoilt: 100 Quota: 1,188 Turnout: 8,415 (47.69%)

== Changes ==
=== Co-options ===
Party	Outgoing	LEA	Reason	Date	Co-optee
Labour	Nessa Cosgrove	Sligo–Strandhill	Elected to 27th Seanad at the 2025 Seanad election	18 February 2025	Ann Higgins
Fianna Fáil	Tom MacSharry	Sligo–Strandhill	Appointed District Court Judge	12 May 2026	Seamus Kilgannon

=== Changes in affiliation ===
Name	LEA	Elected as	New affiliation	Date
Michael Clarke	Ballymote–Tubbercurry	Independent	Independent Ireland	17 October 2024
Joe Queenan	Ballymote–Tubbercurry	Independent	Fianna Fáil	2 July 2026

== Sources ==
- Comisky, John (1 February 2024). "Election 2024: An overview of 125 years of Local and Euro elections". Sligo Weekender. p. 22.
- "European Election 2024". Irish Freedom Party. 29 January 2024.
- McLaughlin, Gerry (27 March 2024). "Award-winning filmmaker Johnny Gogan on his reasons for running in the Sligo local elections". The Sligo Champion – via Irish Independent.
- McLaughlin, Gerry (27 March 2024). "Sligo Councillor Rosaleen O'Grady 'loved every minute' as she bids farewell to politics after 25 years". The Sligo Champion – via Irish Independent.
- "Son of former RTE current affairs presenter and TD enters the political fray in Sligo". The Sligo Champion. 6 March 2024 – via Irish Independent.
