= 1991 Sligo County Council election =

Part of the 1991 Irish local elections

- 27 June 1991

All 25 seats on Sligo County Council
	First party	Second party	Third party
Party	Fianna Fáil	Fine Gael	Independent Socialist
Seats won	11	11	1
Seat change	-	+2	-
	Fourth party	Fifth party
Party	Independent	Labour
Seats won	2	0
Seat change	-1	-1
- Map showing the area of Sligo County Council
Council control after election
TBD

An election to Sligo County Council took place on 27 June 1991 as part of that year's Irish local elections. 25 councillors were elected from five local electoral areas (LEAs) for a five-year term of office on the electoral system of proportional representation by means of the single transferable vote (PR-STV). This term was extended twice, first to 1998, then to 1999.

== Results by party ==
Party	Seats	±	First Pref. votes	FPv%	±%
Fianna Fáil	11	-	11,858	44.43	
Fine Gael	11	+2	9,151	34.29	
Independent Socialist	1	-	1,456	5.46	
Independent	2	-1	2,642	9.90	
Labour	0	-1	894	3.35	
Totals	25	-	26,689	100.00	—

== Results by local electoral area ==
=== Ballymote ===
Ballymote - 7 seats
Party	Candidate	FPv%	Count					
Party	Candidate	FPv%	1	2	3	4	5	6
Fine Gael	Tony McLoughlin*	12.4%	910	935				
Fine Gael	Tommy Lavin*	9.6%	703	717	743	768	851	879
Fianna Fáil	Michael Conlon	9.5%	699	706	733	759	838	949
Fine Gael	Leo Conlon*	9.4%	691	701	725	730	828	883
Fianna Fáil	Eamon Scanlon	9.3%	680	694	725	787	840	885
Fine Gael	Gerry Murray	9.0%	663	669	683	790	831	850
Fianna Fáil	Tommy Deignan*	8.1%	595	602	615	642	716	776
Fianna Fáil	John Sherlock*	7.8%	571	575	607	682	739	920
Fianna Fáil	Patrick Carty*	7.5%	554	559	590	616	649	
Independent	Alfie Parke	6.6%	484	502	564	584		
Fianna Fáil	Joe Shannon*	5.1%	372	373	385			
Independent Socialist	John McCarrick	3.7%	271	307				
Labour	Catherine Masiacz	2%	150	274				
Electorate: 10,555 Valid: 7,343 (69.57%) Spoilt: 50 Quota: 918 Turnout: 7,393 (70.04%)

=== Dromore ===
Dromore - 4 seats
Party	Candidate	FPv%	Count				
Party	Candidate	FPv%	1	2	3	4	5
Fine Gael	Paul Conmy*	26.2%	951	985	1,102		
Fianna Fáil	Paddy Conway*	18.6%	781	837	994		
Fine Gael	Mary Barrett	15.3%	643	773	931		
Fianna Fáil	Syl Mulligan*	14.5%	608	620	746	788	840
Fianna Fáil	Michael Clarke	12.9%	541	563			
Fianna Fáil	Gabriel Healy	12.6%	531	571	667	735	769
Electorate: 5,920 Valid: 4,206 (71.05%) Spoilt: 53 Quota: 842 Turnout: 4,236 (71.55%)

=== Drumcliffe ===
Drumcliffe - 5 seats
Party	Candidate	FPv%	Count								
Party	Candidate	FPv%	1	2	3	4	5	6	7	8	9
Fine Gael	Joe Leonard*	16.9%	952								
Fianna Fáil	Dr. Jimmy Devins	13.3%	749	758	761	794	852	853	900	932	1,020
Fianna Fáil	Senator Willie Farrell*	10.7%	605	609	620	629	705	707	728	810	836
Fine Gael	Ita Fox*	10.1%	570	581	656	686	693	698	760	805	895
Fianna Fáil	Felim O'Rourke	9.8%	549	557	562	588	628	628	660	674	728
Independent	Michael Carroll	8.4%	475	484	518	543	580	582	666	721	956
Labour	Stephen McDonagh	7.91	445	461	466	510	522	522	547	580	
Independent Socialist	John Harrison	5%	282	316	334	339	342	344	361		
Progressive Democrats	Hugh Slevin	4.6%	257	268	284	301	312	313			
Fianna Fáil	John Mulrooney*	4.3%	244	247	253	255					
Independent	Sheelagh Hanly	3.7%	206	209	212						
Fine Gael	Maureen Regan	3.1%	177	181							
Independent Socialist	Frank Dobbs	2.1%	117								
Electorate: 9,182 Valid: 5,628 (61.29%) Spoilt: 155 Quota: 939 Turnout: 5,678 (61.84%)

=== Sligo ===
Sligo - 5 seats
Party	Candidate	FPv%	Count							
Party	Candidate	FPv%	1	2	3	4	5	6	7	8
Fianna Fáil	Gerry Healy	20.1%	1,043							
Fine Gael	Jim McGarry	14.8%	769	795	801	834	873			
Independent Socialist	Declan Bree*	13.0%	675	697	787	811	875			
Fianna Fáil	Seán McManus*	9.7%	506	531	534	578	586	615	670	879
Sinn Féin	Seán MacManus	8.3%	431	441	442	457	478	490	580	637
Fine Gael	Peter Henry*	8.3%	430	444	446	454	468	618	677	752
Fianna Fáil	Roddy McGuinn	5.9%	307	345	345	388	410	437	493	
Labour	Tommy Higgins*	5.8%	299	305	310	315	334	373		
Fine Gael	Matt Lyons	5.1%	267	274	274	278	286			
Independent	Michael Gillen	3.7%	194	199	202	208				
Fianna Fáil	John Monaghan*	3.2%	168	189	190					
Independent Socialist	Pat Fallon	2.1%	111	113						
Electorate: 8,247 Valid: 5,200 (63.05%) Spoilt: 45 Quota: 867 Turnout: 5,245 (63.60%)

=== Tubbercurry ===
Tubbercurry - 4 seats
Party	Candidate	FPv%	Count				
Party	Candidate	FPv%	1	2	3	4	5
Independent	Margaret Gormley*	25.7%	1,107				
Fianna Fáil	Matt Brennan TD*	23.4%	1,009				
Fine Gael	Joe Cawley*	17.3%	747	824	872		
Fianna Fáil	Aidan Colleary*	12.7%	547	576	637	708	826
Fine Gael	Michael Fleming	12.2%	527	595	614	695	767
Fianna Fáil	Peter McKeon	4.6%	199	261	275	283	
Independent	Denis O'Hara	4.1%	176	184	188		
Electorate: 5,618 Valid: 4,312 (76.75%) Spoilt: 35 Quota: 863 Turnout: 4,347 (77.38%)
