= Standards in Public Office =

Standards in Public Office may refer to:

- Standards in Public Office Commission, an Irish statutory body concerned with disclosure of interests, election expenditure and registration of lobbying
- RTÉ Investigates: Standards in Public Office, an Irish television programme broadcast in December 2015
