= Joe Queenan =

Joe Queenan may refer to:

- Joe Queenan (author), American freelance satirist and critic
- Joe Queenan (politician), Irish politician
