= Chris MacManus =

Irish politician (born 1973)

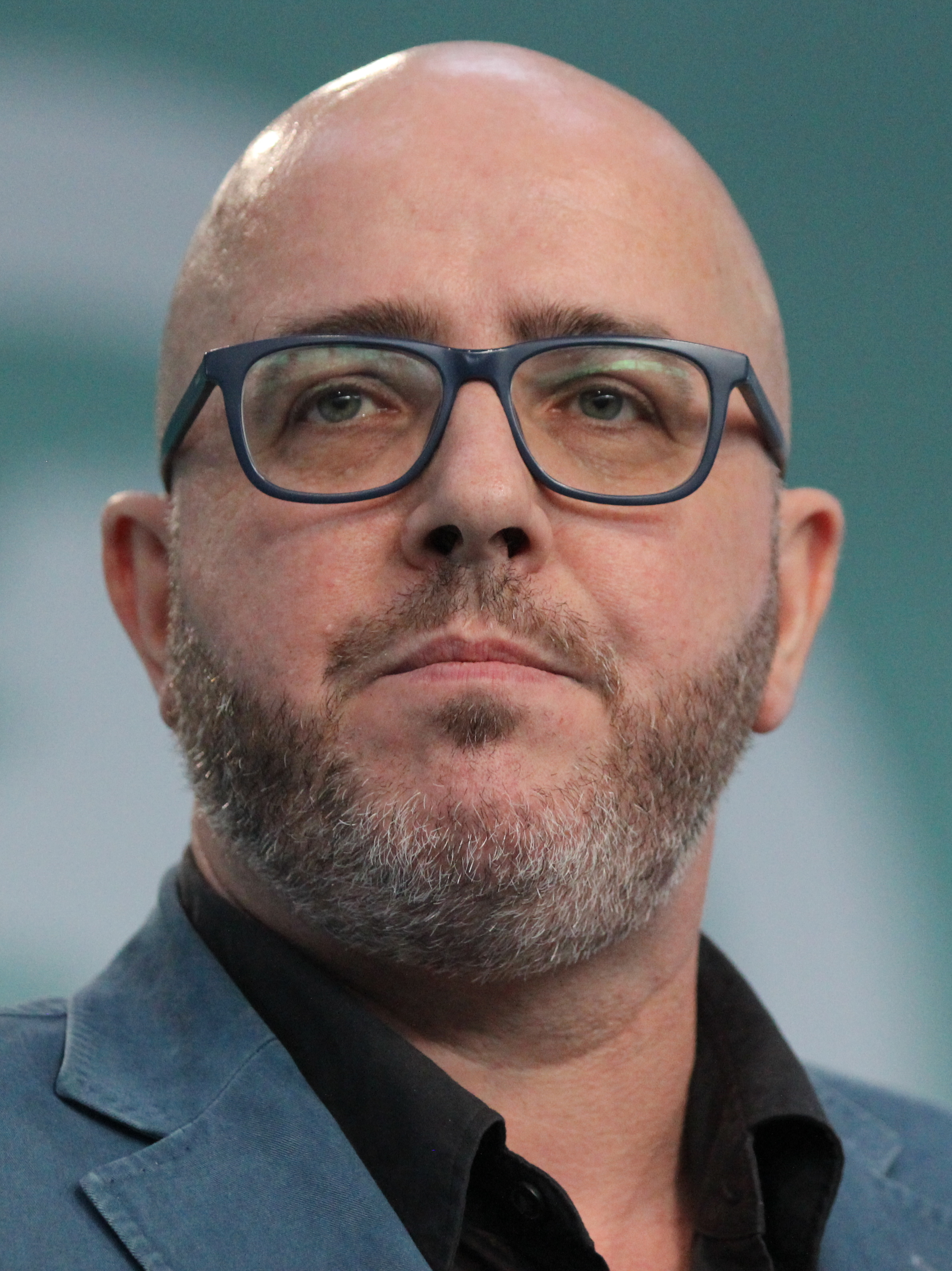
- MacManus in 2023

Member of the European Parliament
- In office 6 March 2020 – 17 July 2024
- Constituency: Midlands–North-West

Sligo County Councillor
- In office March 2017 – February 2020

Personal details
- Born: 13 March 1973 (age 53) London, England
- Party: Ireland: Sinn Féin; EU: GUE/NGL
- Parent: Seán MacManus (father)
- Relatives: Joseph MacManus (brother)

Chris MacManus (born 13 March 1973) is an Irish politician who served as a Member of the European Parliament (MEP) from Ireland for the Midlands–North-West constituency from March 2020 to July 2024. He is a member of Sinn Féin, part of The Left in the European Parliament.

== Personal life ==
His father is Seán MacManus, a retired Sinn Féin politician. His older brother, Joseph MacManus, was an IRA volunteer who was killed in Belleek, County Fermanagh, in February 1992. He was born in London, but in late 1976 the family returned to Ireland to live in Sligo town.

He was cast in Ken Loach's Cannes nominated film Jimmy's Hall in 2014, which was filmed extensively in Counties Sligo and Leitrim.

== Political career ==
He was a member of Sligo Borough Council (formerly Sligo Corporation) from 1999 to 2014, having been elected on three occasions, and was a member of Sligo County Council from 2017 to 2020. He was co-opted in March 2017 to replace his father Seán MacManus, and retained the seat at the 2019 Sligo County Council election.

He contested the 2016 general election in Sligo–Leitrim and was the last candidate to be eliminated.

MEP Matt Carthy was elected as a TD for the Cavan–Monaghan constituency at the 2020 general election. MacManus was nominated to replace him in the European Parliament.

MacManus sat on the Agriculture and Rural Development Committee where he advocated on behalf of small Irish family farmers, and highlighted the lack of investment in the west of Ireland, and campaigned to have the Western Rail Corridor opened. He was also a member of the Committee on Economic and Monetary Affairs in addition to the EU Delegations for relations with South Africa and with Palestine.

He lost his seat at the 2024 European Parliament election following a poor campaign by Sinn Féin in both those and the 2024 Irish local elections held on the same day.

MacManus was also an unsuccessful candidate in Sligo–Leitrim at the 2024 general election, again being the last candidate eliminated, despite outpolling TD Marian Harkin on the first count.

He currently serves as chairperson of County Sligo Sinn Féin having been selected by its members.
