= County Hall, Sligo =

Municipal building in County Sligo, Ireland

Coordinates: 54.2706°N 8.4627°W

County Hall (Irish: Áras an Chontae, Sligeach) is a municipal facility at Riverside, Sligo, County Sligo, Ireland.

== History ==
Originally meetings of Sligo County Council were held at Sligo Courthouse. The county council moved to modern facilities at Riverside in June 1979. The building was substantially re-modeled, to a design by Murray Ó Laoire Architects, to create a new council chamber and reception area: the new facilities were opened by Noel Dempsey, Minister for the Environment and Local Government, in June 2001.
