= Sligo Courthouse =

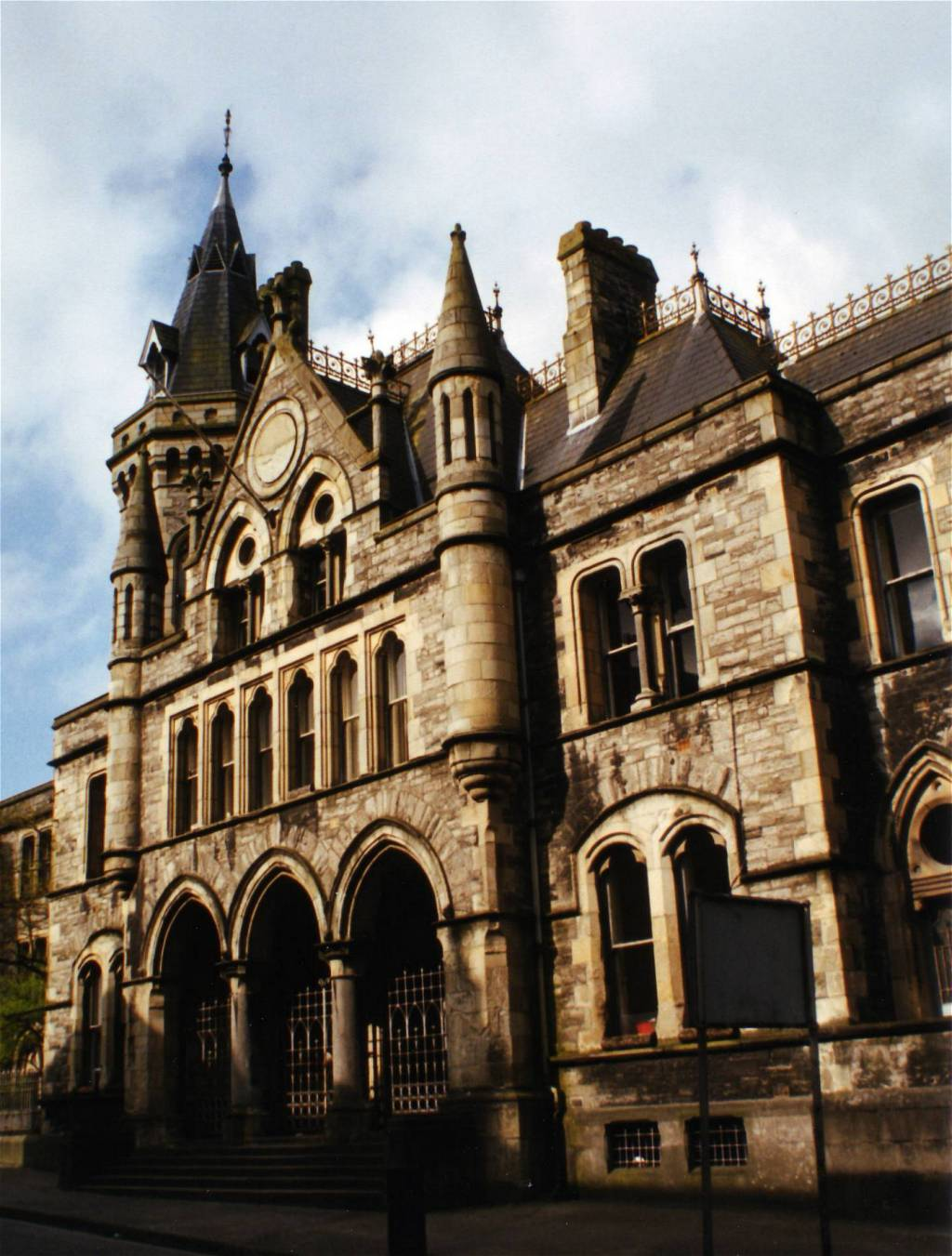
- Sligo Courthouse

- Location within Ireland

General information
- Architectural style: French gothic style
- Location: Sligo, County Sligo, Ireland
- Coordinates: 54.2698°N 8.4719°W
- Completed: 1878

Design and construction
- Architect: Carroll & Batchelor

Sligo Courthouse is a judicial facility on Teeling Street in Sligo, County Sligo, Ireland.

== History ==
The courthouse, which was designed by James Rawson Carroll in the French gothic style and built in ashlar stone, was completed in 1878. The design involved an asymmetrical main frontage with ten bays facing Teeling Street; the central section of the three bays was arcaded on the ground floor and contained a six-part mullioned window on the first floor flanked by bartizans; the gable above contained two pairs of mullioned windows and a circular panel. There was a four-stage octagonal tower with a spire in the left hand section.

The building was originally used as a facility for dispensing justice but, following the implementation of the Local Government (Ireland) Act 1898, which established county councils in every county, it also became the meeting place for Sligo County Council. The county council moved to County Hall in June 1979.
