= Joseph MacManus =

Provisional IRA member

Joe MacManus
- Born: 23 May 1970; Harlesden, London, England
- Died: 5 February 1992 (aged 21); Belleek, County Fermanagh, Northern Ireland
- Military career
- Allegiance: Provisional Irish Republican Army
- Service years: 1987–1992
- Rank: Volunteer
- Unit: Sligo Brigade
- Conflict: The Troubles

Joseph Edward "Joe" MacManus (often incorrectly spelt Joe McManus) (Irish Seosamh Mac Mághnais; 23 May 1970 – 5 February 1992), was a volunteer in the Sligo Brigade of the Provisional Irish Republican Army. He was killed during a shoot-out after his unit attempted a killing in Mulleek near Belleek, County Fermanagh, Northern Ireland.

== Background ==
MacManus was born in Harlesden, north-west London, which at the time had a large Irish community. His father, Seán MacManus, a native of Gubaveeney, near Blacklion, County Cavan, had moved to London in the 1960s to find work. There he met and married Helen McGovern, a native of Glenfarne, County Leitrim. In 1976, the family returned to Ireland to live in the working-class Maugheraboy area of Sligo town so that the boys could be educated in Ireland.

He was educated to primary level at Scoil Ursula Primary School, Strandhill Road, Sligo and St. John's Marist Brothers National School, Temple Street, Sligo to secondary level at Summerhill College and at third level at Sligo RTC. MacManus played football for local junior teams Collegians and Corinthians, and Gaelic football for both Saint Mary's GFC of Maugheraboy and Coolera GFC of Strandhill.

His father Seán, who at the time was a leading republican, later became Mayor of Sligo. He was the secretary of the County Sligo anti H-Block Committee in the 1980s. He was the first Sinn Féin Mayor in the Republic of Ireland since the beginning of The Troubles in 1969. His father was also involved in the negotiations leading to the Good Friday Agreement. Joe's younger brother, Chris, was a Sinn Féin Councillor for Sligo Borough Council and Sligo County Council for many years and is an MEP since March 2020.

== Paramilitary activity ==
In 1987, MacManus attended the funeral of Jim Lynagh, one of those killed in the Loughall ambush. In 1988, at the age of 18, he joined the Provisional IRA's Sligo Brigade.

In 1991, he joined a Ballyshannon-based active service unit which replaced the West Fermanagh Brigade, disbanded after the Enniskillen bombing. Initially, he carried out minor operations including moving munitions between arms dumps, passing intelligence between operatives and attending training camps in the region. On 2 February 1992, he and the rest of his unit, James Hughes, Conor O'Neill and Noel Magee, met at a safe house in Ballyshannon, County Donegal to make final arrangement for an operation which was to take place later in the following week.

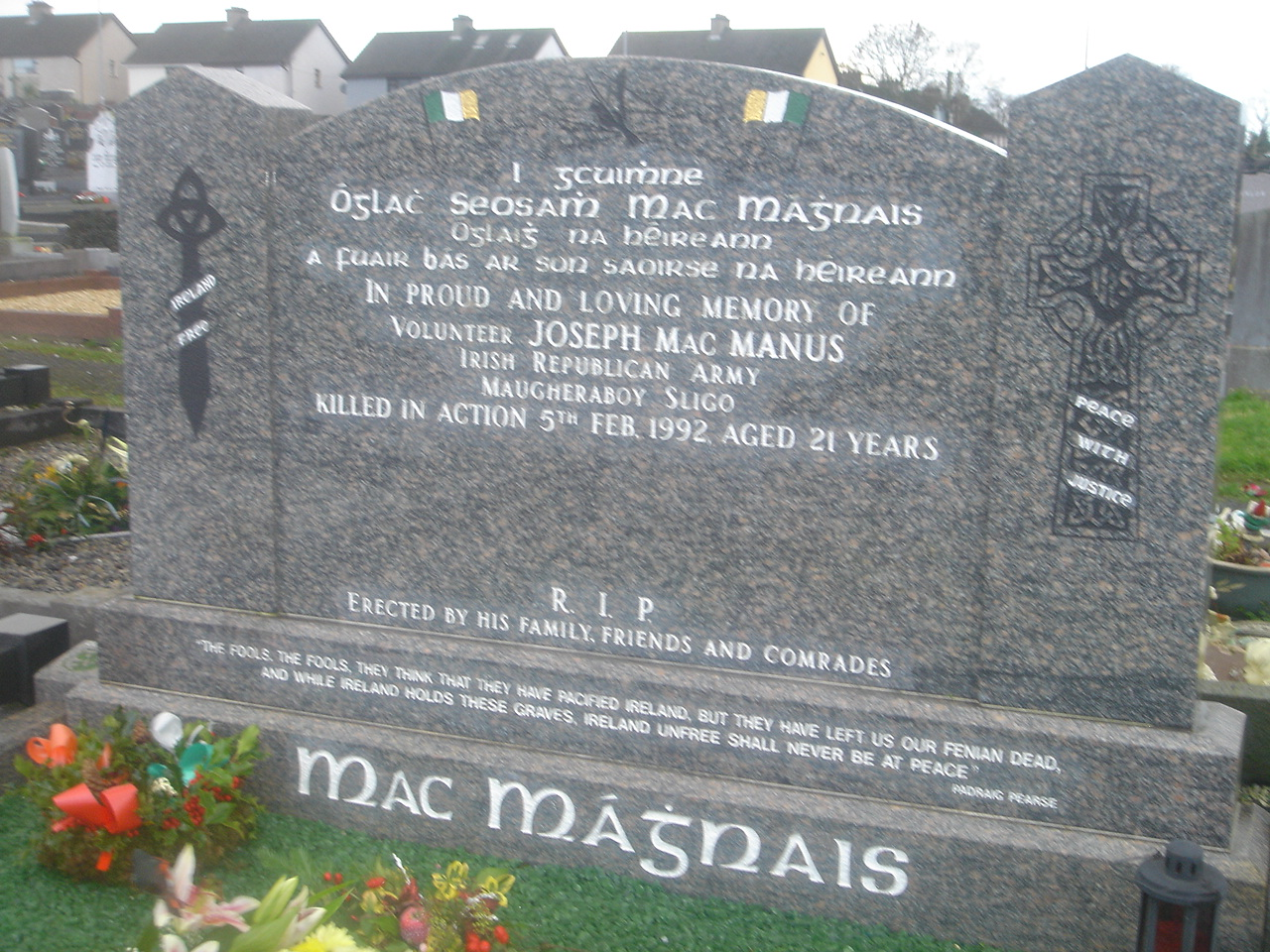
MacManus' headstone at Sligo City Cemetery

== Mulleek ambush ==
On 3 February, MacManus and his unit crossed the border and took over the house of farmer Pat Loughran. Loughran was ordered to lure Eric Glass, an Ulster Defence Regiment soldier and part-time Fermanagh District Council dog warden, to his home on the pretence that his dog had attacked a family member.

Corporal Eric Glass of the 4th (Co Fermanagh) Battalion, Ulster Defence Regiment (4 UDR), a former member of the B-Specials, arrived at the farmhouse on the morning of 5 February. When Glass arrived at the gate of the farmhouse he was suddenly surrounded by the active service unit and ordered to get out of his van. Glass then reached for his Walther P5 handgun, which he always had ready, loaded and hidden under a jacket on the passenger seat of his van, and fired 3 rounds at a gunman armed with a revolver at the passenger door. A gun battle ensued in which the other gunmen opened fire with AK47 assault rifles. Glass exited the van and returned fire from behind the front wheel, however he was badly injured. His thigh bone was shattered and the bone partially penetrated his skin. He managed to fight off his attackers, killing MacManus in the process. Glass managed to crawl into the farmhouse and call for assistance. The British Army helicopter dispatched to secure the area spotted the remaining gunmen fleeing towards the border, and they were later arrested by the Garda Síochána. Corporal Glass later received both the Queen's Gallantry Medal and Distinguished Conduct Medal for bravery, making him the "most decorated" UDR soldier. An account of the attack on Corporal Glass was carried in the Belfast News Letter.

Eric Bullick, Alliance Party spokesman for Fermanagh-South Tyrone, commenting on the shooting said:

...the fact that an active service unit of the IRA had been taken out of operation should be a relief to the whole community because it meant that further loss of life would be avoided. Within four days of a meeting between senior members of the Alliance Party and senior officers of the Garda Siochana in Phoenix Park in Dublin, we have an example of cross border security co-operation at its very best.

== Monument issue ==
In 2002, a dispute resulted after a monument to Joe MacManus and fellow volunteers Antoine Mac Giolla Bhrighde and Kieran Fleming was sited close to the place where Protestant workmen William Hassard and Frederick Love were murdered by the IRA in 1988.

A Sinn Féin spokesman stated that "The families of Ciaran Fleming, Joseph MacManus and Antoine Mac Giolla Bhrighde, the three IRA men commemorated by the monument, had given the go-ahead for the structure to be moved".

== Legacy ==
The Sligo Town Cumann of Sinn Féin is named the Noble Six/O'Flanagan/MacManus Cumann in honour of MacManus and in previous years lectures have been held in his name which has been addressed by Caoimhghín Ó Caoláin, Pat Doherty, Pearse Doherty, Aengus Ó Snodaigh and Gerry Adams.

== See also ==
- Seán South
- Martin Savage

== Sources ==
- Kevin Toolis, Rebel Hearts, p. 333-65
- Piaras F. MacLochlainn, Last Words, p. 19–22
- A Testimony to Courage – the Regimental History of the Ulster Defence Regiment 1969 – 1992, John Potter, Pen & Sword Books Ltd, 2001, ISBN 0-85052-819-4
