= 2004 Sligo County Council election =

Part of the 2004 Irish local elections

- 11 June 2004

All 25 seats on Sligo County Council
	First party	Second party	Third party
Party	Fianna Fáil	Fine Gael	Labour
Seats won	10	10	3
Seat change	+1	-1	+1
	Fourth party	Fifth party
Party	Sinn Féin	Independent
Seats won	1	1
Seat change	-	-1
- Map showing the area of Sligo County Council
Council control after election
TBD

An election to Sligo County Council took place on 11 June 2004 as part of that year's Irish local elections. 25 councillors were elected from five local electoral areas (LEAs) for a five-year term of office on the electoral system of proportional representation by means of the single transferable vote (PR-STV).

== Results by party ==
Party	Seats	±	First Pref. votes	FPv%	±%
Fianna Fáil	10	+1	12,331	37.42	
Fine Gael	10	-1	12,115	36.76	
Labour	3	+1	3,434	10.42	
Sinn Féin	1	-	2,546	7.73	
Independent	1	-1	2,529	7.67	
Totals	25	-	32,955	100.00	—

== Results by local electoral area ==
=== Ballymote ===
Ballymote - 5 seats
Party	Candidate	FPv%	Count							
Party	Candidate	FPv%	1	2	3	4	5	6	7	8
Fianna Fáil	Martin Baker	19.92	1,435							
Fine Gael	Gerard Mullaney	12.58	906	977	987	1,014	1,074	1,264		
Fine Gael	Gerry Murray*	11.38	820	828	831	843	891	946	963	1,085
Fianna Fáil	John Sherlock	10.79	777	802	863	948	998	1,116	1,124	1,269
Fianna Fáil	Joe Shannon*	9.49	684	726	729	749	798	820	823	908
Fine Gael	Pat McGrath	8.36	602	611	616	640	775	831	847	1,042
Fine Gael	Thomas Walsh	7.77	560	593	602	628	654			
Independent	Alfie Parke*	6.68	481	507	519	575	666	776	795	
Labour	Tim Mulcahy	6.51	469	474	501	556				
Sinn Féin	Joe Gilmartin	4.58	330	343	349					
Independent	Michael Scanlon	1.94	140	142						
Electorate: 10,169 Valid: 7,204 (70.84%) Spoilt: 76 Quota: 1,201 Turnout: 7,280 (71.59%)

=== Dromore ===
Dromore - 3 seats
Party	Candidate	FPv%	Count		
Party	Candidate	FPv%	1	2	3
Fianna Fáil	Joe Queenan*	30.92	1,254		
Fine Gael	Mary Barrett*	26.50	1,075		
Fine Gael	Paul Conmy*	20.22	820	927	1,036
Sinn Féin	Padraig Hallinan	13.04	529	584	758
Fianna Fáil	Gerry O'Connor	9.32	378	455	
Electorate: 5,793 Valid: 4,056 (70.02%) Spoilt: 48 Quota: 1,015 Turnout: 4,104 (70.84%)

=== Sligo Drumcliff ===
Sligo Drumcliff - 6 seats
Party	Candidate	FPv%	Count								
Party	Candidate	FPv%	1	2	3	4	5	6	7	8	9
Fine Gael	Joe Leonard*	18.38	1,411								
Fianna Fáil	Jude Devins	15.08	1,158								
Fianna Fáil	Patsy Barry*	13.55	1,040	1,157							
Labour	Veronica Cawley	10.59	813	839	919	930	938	994	1,056	1,236	
Fine Gael	Ita Fox*	8.32	639	699	720	727	740	855	946	1,011	1,045
Fine Gael	John Peyton	7.45	572	630	639	646	654	690	745	794	809
Sinn Féin	Des Skeffington	7.13	547	571	599	603	613	637	678		
Fianna Fáil	Seamus Kilgannon*	6.71	515	521	525	537	540	598	762	828	849
Fianna Fáil	Pádraig Branley*	5.18	398	410	418	430	445	536			
Fianna Fáil	Brian McHugh	5.11	392	399	410	418	421				
Labour	Brian Scanlon*	2.50	192	196							
Electorate: 12,221 Valid: 7,677 (62.82%) Spoilt: 127 Quota: 1,097 Turnout: 7,804 (63.86%)

=== Sligo Strandhill ===
Sligo Strandhill - 7 seats
Party	Candidate	FPv%	Count							
Party	Candidate	FPv%	1	2	3	4	5	6	7	8
Fine Gael	Tony McLoughlin*	24.12	2,054							
Labour	Declan Bree*	13.47	1,147							
Sinn Féin	Seán MacManus*	13.39	1,140							
Labour	Jim McGarry*	9.55	813	940	973	1,004	1,028	1,067		
Fianna Fáil	Deirdre Healy-McGowan	9.03	769	915	922	930	939	981	1,010	1,217
Fianna Fáil	Albert Higgins*	8.32	708	835	840	846	853	883	890	967
Fine Gael	Imelda Henry	8.08	688	966	977	1,008	1,016	1,176		
Fianna Fáil	Roddy McGuinn*	5.79	493	567	578	587	598	607	622	681
Fianna Fáil	Francis Cadden	4.42	376	440	447	456	468	498	513	
Fine Gael	Jarlath Hunt	2.44	208	360	364	375	379			
Independent	Jim O'Sullivan	1.39	118	139	143					
Electorate: 13,445 Valid: 8,514 (63.32%) Spoilt: 189 Quota: 1,065 Turnout: 8,703 (64.73%)

=== Tobercurry ===
Tobercurry - 4 seats
Party	Candidate	FPv%	Count				
Party	Candidate	FPv%	1	2	3	4	5
Independent	Margaret Gormley*	32.56	1,790				
Fianna Fáil	Aidan Colleary*	16.68	917	984	1,116		
Fine Gael	Michael Fleming*	14.08	742	911	1,011	1,277	
Fianna Fáil	Jerry Lundy	10.35	659	743	846	971	1,030
Fine Gael	Brendan Kivlehan	8.50	606	730	780	876	994
Fine Gael	Joe Cawley*	8.07	412	516	576		
Fianna Fáil	Kieran O'Dowd	7.56	372	514			
Electorate: 7,418 Valid: 5,498 (74.12%) Spoilt: 76 Quota: 1,100 Turnout: 5,574 (75.14%)
