= Sligo–Leitrim Independent Socialist Organisation =

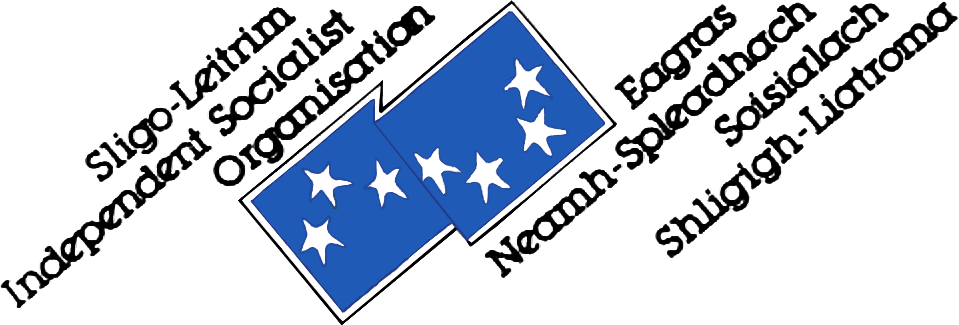
- Leader: Declan Bree
- Founded: 1974
- Dissolved: 1991
- Merged into: Labour Party
- Ideology: Democratic socialism; Irish republicanism
- Political position: Left-wing

Sligo–Leitrim Independent Socialist Organisation (SLISO) was a minor political party led by Sligo County Councillor Declan Bree. It was set up in 1974 and contested local elections to Sligo County Council and Dáil Éireann elections for the Sligo–Leitrim constituency. The group stood other candidates but Bree was the only candidate ever elected for the group. In 1991 the group merged with the Labour Party and Bree was elected as a Labour Party TD at the 1992 general election. Bree resigned from the Labour Party in 2007.

== Elections ==
=== General Elections (Sligo–Leitrim) ===
| Year | Votes | % | Position | Seats |
|---|---|---|---|---|
| 1989 | 4,947 | 11.6% | #5 | 0 / 4 |
| 1987 | 2,584 | 5.7% | #6 | 0 / 4 |
| Nov 1982 | 1,832 | 3.9% | #7 | 0 / 4 |
| Feb 1982 | 1,035 | 2.3% | #8 | 0 / 4 |
| 1981 | 934 | 2.0% | #8 | 0 / 4 |
| 1977 | 1,282 | 3.6% | #6 | 0 / 3 |

=== Local elections ===
Elections to Sligo County Council

| Year | Candidates | Votes | % | Position | Seats |
|---|---|---|---|---|---|
| 1991 | 5 | 1,456 | 5.46% | #3 | 1 / 25 |
| 1985 | 3 | 1,197 | 4.31% | #3 | 1 / 25 |
| 1979 | | 1,154 | 9.7% | | 1 / 24 |
| 1974 | | 550 | 5.2% | | 1 / 24 |
