= Nessa Cosgrove =

Irish politician

Senator Nessa Cosgrove
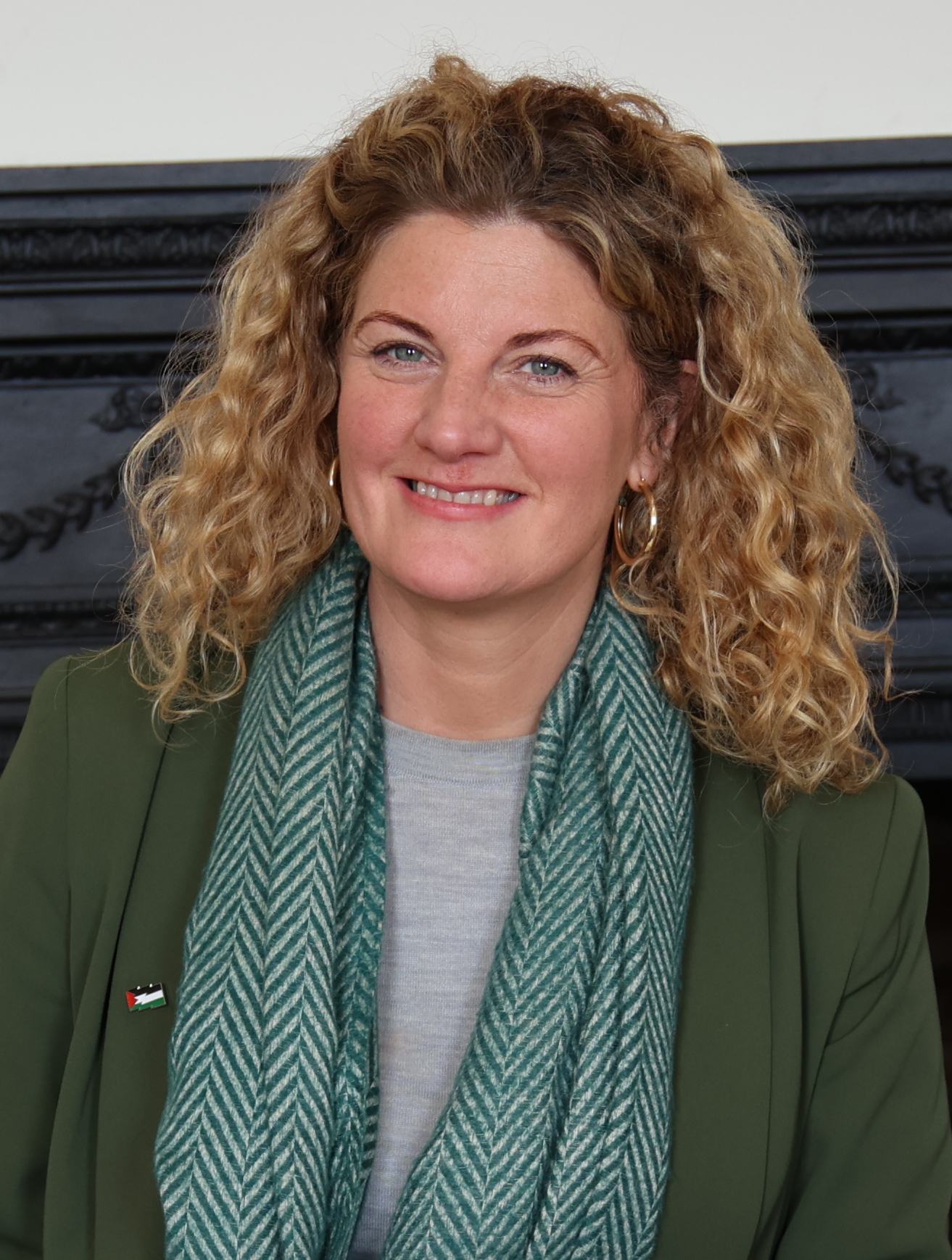
- Cosgrove in 2025

Senator
- Incumbent
- Assumed office January 2025
- Constituency: Labour Panel

Personal details
- Born: Nessa O'Callaghan Cork, Ireland
- Party: Labour Party
- Spouse: Conor Cosgrove
- Children: 3
- Education: University College Cork

Nessa Cosgrove (née O'Callaghan) is an Irish Labour Party politician who has been a senator for the Labour Panel since January 2025.

Originally from Bandon, County Cork, she moved to Sligo in 2003, where she lives with her husband and three children. She studied at University College Cork, obtaining a bachelor's degree and master's degree in social science.

She was a member of Sligo County Council for the Sligo–Strandhill area from June 2024 to January 2025. She was an unsuccessful candidate for the Sligo–Leitrim constituency at the 2020 and 2024 general elections.

Her brother Shane O'Callaghan is a Fine Gael member of Cork City Council.
