= Joe Queenan (politician) =

Irish politician

Sligo County Councillor
- Incumbent
- Assumed office 2014
- Constituency: Ballymote-Tubbercurry
- In office June 1999 – June 2014
- Constituency: Dromore

Personal details
- Born: Joseph Queenan
- Party: Independent; Fianna Fáil to Dec 2015
- Profession: Businessman

Joseph Queenan is an Irish politician. He is a member of the Sligo County Council, first elected for Fianna Fáil in 1999 and representing the Dromore Electoral Area from then until its dissolution and replacement by the newly merged Ballymote and Tubbercurry Electoral Areas ahead of 2014's election. Queenan was re-elected in 2014 representing the Ballymote-Tubbercurry electoral area.

== Electoral history ==
Queenan first stood as a candidate for Fianna Fáil at the 1999 Sligo County Council election; successful, he took a seat for the party in the Dromore Electoral Area. He topped the poll for Fianna Fáil at the 2004 Sligo County Council election. Queenan was re-elected for Fianna Fáil in the Dromore Electrical Area at the 2009 Sligo County Council election. He was elected for Fianna Fáil in the new Ballymote-Tubbercurry Electrical Area at the 2014 Sligo County Council election, notably finishing ahead of party colleague Eamon Scanlon, the former TD and Senator. He left Fianna Fáil in 2015, and was re-elected as an independent councillor at the 2019 and 2024 elections.

== RTÉ Investigates programme ==
Queenan was one of three politicians secretly filmed for RTÉ Investigates: Standards in Public Office, which aired straight after the Nine O'Clock News on 8 December 2015. For the purposes of its programme, RTÉ established an imaginary company it named Vinst Opportunities, with imaginary investors searching for ways to set up wind farms without having to deal with any problems that might arise if the imaginary company and its imaginary investors sought planning permission. Discovering that his public declaration of financial interests did not include a farm, several businesses and a (just recently submitted) application for planning permission, RTÉ contacted Queenan.

Queenan met with the imaginary representative of the imaginary company, who secretly filmed him. Queenan told the imaginary company representative: "Really what I can be is a link man or a gopher or whatever between your architects and the local authority. And I will be your eyes and ears because I will know, because they will tell me. We have a good working relationship and if there is [sic] amendments to be done or anything more … I will go in and talk to planners and see and encourage and impress on them." Queenan went on to say he was "not looking for anything out of it" but expressed interest in having the imaginary company invest in a property he intended to buy for business reasons. Queenan told the imaginary representative: "It makes good sense, business sense … It would mean an investment of max, say, €200,000".

But Queenan also said that this had been "off the top of" his head. This led to uncertainty in RTÉ over Queenan's intentions; thus, the imaginary representative of the imaginary company returned to check if the proposed sum of money would be regarded as a loan or an investment. Queenan responded to the effect that either would be fine as long as it was "above board" and done "for the benefit of Sligo". During the exchange with the imaginary representative Queenan said he expected honesty throughout any dealings he might have with the imaginary company: "I hope everything we say is not being taped or [sic] totally confident... I trust you in this now that we are not … I hope you are being as frank and honest with me as I am with you."

Queenan responded to RTÉ's airing of its programme on radio, saying the operation had been a "sting" and that everything the programme claimed to have uncovered had been hypothetical.

In December 2015 Queenan resigned from Fianna Fáil.

In April 2018, the Standards in Public Office Commission (SIPO) announced that Queenan would face an ethics hearing that September as part of its response to the programme; he was the first of the three councillors called before the hearing. In March 2019, the Commission announced it had found partially against Queenan, stating that he had not sought money in exchange for political work but that he had "agreed to help the fictitious company" in exchange for payment, that he had been careless in declaring his financial interests and that he had overlooked the Code of Conduct during his "dealings with the undercover reporter".
