= Willie Farrell =

Irish politician (1928–2010)

Senator
- In office 25 April 1987 – 12 September 2002
- In office 13 May 1982 – 23 February 1983
- Constituency: Industrial and Commercial Panel

Personal details
- Born: 28 May 1928; County Sligo, Ireland
- Died: 8 April 2010 (aged 81); County Sligo, Ireland
- Political party: Fianna Fáil

William P. Farrell (28 May 1928 – 8 April 2010) was a Fianna Fáil politician from Grange, County Sligo in Ireland. He was a senator from 1982 to 1983, and from 1987 to 2002.

An auctioneer, he was first elected to Sligo County Council in 1967, and remained a member until resigning his seat in 1997. He was elected in 1982 to the 16th Seanad, on the Industrial and Commercial Panel. He lost his seat at the 1983 Seanad election, but was re-elected in 1987 to the 18th Seanad and held the seat until he retired at the 2002 Seanad election.

Farrell was criticised in the Seanad and beyond in May 1990. The house was debating the Larceny Bill 1989, and an amendment by Joe Costello proposed to remove the clause in existing legislation which made "the abominable crime of buggery" a criminal offence. Farrell launched an attack on the opposition parties and on gay senator David Norris, in which he said "I am amazed at Senator Norris, an educated, intelligent man like him, is so obsessed with his favourite sexual activity that he put that before the welfare of the people who are being robbed and plundered", and went on to say "We are going, with our amendment to allow perverts of all kinds". Farrell's comments were criticised by senators from all parties, including Tras Honan, a former Cathaoirleach, and Fine Gael called his remarks "vicious".

The following day, Farrell made a statement to the Seanad in which he said that his remarks were "completely misconstrued" and that "the record of the House will show I was specifically speaking about blackmail". He added "I am very sorry about the use of the word 'pervert'. I did not mean it in the context … I did not mean it to affect anybody in this House and I was not referring to anybody in this House". The Cathoirleach, Seán Doherty, did not permit any comment or debate on Farell's statement.

He died on 8 April 2010 in Sligo General Hospital.
