= Paul Taylor (Gaelic footballer) =

Irish Gaelic footballer and manager

Personal information
- Native name: Pól Táilliúir (Irish)
- Occupation: Politician

Sport
- Sport: Gaelic football
Inter-county management
- Years: Team
- 2018–2020: Sligo

Paul Taylor is a Gaelic football manager and former player.

He played as a forward for the Sligo county team between 1993 and 2007. His point of origin is at Eastern Harps, with whom he won six Sligo Senior Football Championships.

He was appointed manager of Sligo in 2018, having earlier worked as a selector under the management of Kevin Walsh.

Taylor oversaw a winless 2019 season for Sligo, an early All-Ireland Senior Football Championship exit following swiftly on from an early Connacht Senior Football Championship exit. These in turn followed relegation from the National Football League, confirmed by a home defeat to Wstmeath in March with two rounds of the competition still to play. A few weeks later, Taylor ran for Fianna Fáil at the 2019 local elections in Sligo and was re-elected to Sligo County Council.

On 12 November 2020, Taylor informed of his decision to depart as Sligo manager, citing "family commitments, work commitments and the current health crisis" as influencing his decision. On 9 January 2021, Roscommon GAA-based intermediate club Kilmore announced Taylor as its manager.

He served as Cathaoirleach of Sligo County Council from 2021 to 20222. Taylor was re-elected at the 2024 local elections.

Preceded by Cathal Corey	Sligo Senior Football Manager; 2018–2020	Succeeded by Tony McEntee
