= RTÉ Investigates: Standards in Public Office =

- Genre: Undercover journalism
- Presented by: Conor Ryan
- Country of origin: Ireland

Original release
- Network: RTÉ One
- Release: 7 December 2015

Standards in Public Office is the title of an RTÉ programme broadcast on 7 December 2015. The programme featured three politicians, Hugh McElvaney (an independent former Mayor of Monaghan who had just left Fine Gael), Joe Queenan of Fianna Fáil and John O'Donnell (another independent), in compromising positions. It was presented by Conor Ryan.

Queenan immediately resigned from Fianna Fáil. McElvaney was asked to resign by his fellow public representatives, as was O'Donnell. All three were dismissed from their representative body, the Local Authority Members Association (LAMA), though John O'Donnell initially refused to leave and then had his membership revoked.

The programme was mentioned in both Houses of the Oireachtas. Taoiseach Enda Kenny referred to the programme in the Dáil. Senator David Norris, while expressing distaste for the actions of those involved, also criticised RTÉ's approach to their investigation as entrapment. McElvaney's gestures, movements and utterances of "sterling", "money" and "loads of money" during the programme were instantly remixed with Los del Río's 1990s song "Macarena".

== Investigation ==
In April 2018, the Standards in Public Office Commission (SIPO) announced that Joe Queenan would face an ethics hearing that September as part of its response to the programme; he was the first of the three councillors called before the hearing. In March 2019, the Commission announced it had found partially against Queenan, stating that he had not sought money in exchange for political work but that he had "agreed to help the fictitious company" in exchange for payment, that he had been careless in declaring his financial interests and that he had overlooked the Code of Conduct during his "dealings with the undercover reporter".

In January 2020, SIPO released a report that concluded Hugh McElvaney had breached ethics laws and also failed to uphold the Code of Conduct for Councillors during his interactions with the fictitious "Nina Carlson", specifically by using his position as county councillor to promote his private business interests in return for a financial reward. The report highlighted the significant fact that it was McElvaney himself who initiated the discussion of financial terms in return for his assistance to the fictitious investment company. Despite SIPO's findings, it subsequently emerged that it had no power to impose penalties on individuals who were found to have breached regulations.
