= Sligo County Council =

Local authority of County Sligo, Ireland

Sligo County Council Comhairle Chontae Shligigh
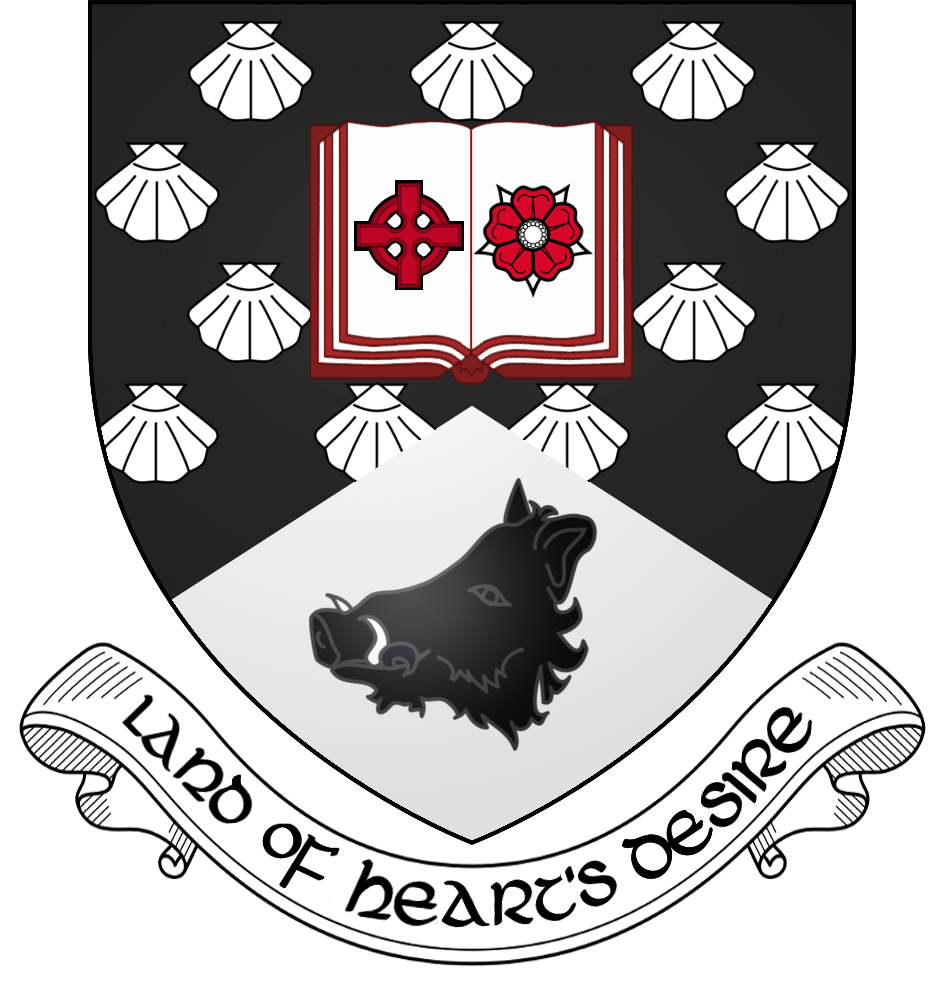

Type
- Type: County council of County Sligo

History
- Founded: 1 April 1899

Leadership
- Cathaoirleach: Dara Mulvey, FG

Structure
- Seats: 18
- Political groups: Fianna Fáil (7) Fine Gael (4) Sinn Féin (2) Labour (1) PBP–Solidarity (1) Independent Ireland (1) Independent (2)

Elections
- Last election: 7 June 2024

Motto
- Land of Heart's Desire

Meeting place
- County Hall, Sligo

Website
- Official website

The area governed by the council

Sligo County Council (Irish: Comhairle Chontae Shligigh) is the local authority of County Sligo, Ireland. As a county council, it is governed by the Local Government Act 2001. The council is responsible for housing and community, roads and transportation, urban planning and development, amenity and culture, and environment. The council has 18 members elected for a five-year term by single transferable vote. The head of the council has the title of Cathaoirleach (chairperson). The county administration is headed by a chief executive, Martin Lydon. The county town is Sligo.

== History ==
Sligo County Council was established on 1 April 1899 under the Local Government (Ireland) Act 1898 for the administrative county of County Sligo. It succeeded the judicial county of Sligo, except for the district electoral divisions of Ardnaree North, Ardnaree South Urban, and Ardnaree South Rural, which were transferred to County Mayo.

Originally meetings of Sligo County Council were held at Sligo Courthouse. The county council moved to modern facilities, known as County Hall (Irish: Áras an Chontae), in June 1979.

Following the 2015 programme RTÉ Investigates: Standards in Public Office, in March 2019, Joe Queenan was found by the Standards in Public Office Commission to have contravened the Local Government Act in three different instances, including failure to maintain proper standards of integrity, conduct and concern for the public interest.

== Regional Assembly ==
Sligo County Council has two representatives on the Northern and Western Regional Assembly where they are part of the Border Strategic Planning Area Committee.

== Elections ==
The Local Government (Ireland) Act 1919 introduced the electoral system of proportional representation by means of the single transferable vote (PR-STV) for the 1920 Irish local elections. (Note: It had been introduced at a borough-level the previous year at the 1919 Sligo Corporation election under the Sligo Corporation Act 1918.) County Sligo was divided into 4 county electoral areas to elect the 20 members of the council. This electoral system has been retained, with 18 members of Sligo County Council now elected for a five-year term of office from 3 multi-member local electoral areas (LEAs).

| Year | FG | FF | SF | PBP | I4C | Lab | UL | ISO | Ind. | Total |
| 2024 | 4 | 6 | 2 | 1 | 0 | 1 | —N/a | —N/a | 4 | 18 |
| 2019 | 6 | 5 | 2 | 1 | 1 | 0 | —N/a | —N/a | 3 | 18 |
| 2014 | 3 | 8 | 2 | 1 | —N/a | 0 | 1 | —N/a | 3 | 18 |
| 2009 | 12 | 7 | 1 | 0 | —N/a | 2 | —N/a | —N/a | 3 | 25 |
| 2004 | 10 | 10 | 1 | —N/a | —N/a | 3 | —N/a | —N/a | 1 | 25 |
| 1999 | 11 | 9 | 1 | —N/a | —N/a | 2 | —N/a | —N/a | 2 | 25 |
| 1991 | 11 | 11 | 0 | —N/a | —N/a | 0 | —N/a | 1 | 2 | 25 |
| 1985 | 9 | 11 | 0 | —N/a | —N/a | 1 | —N/a | 1 | 3 | 25 |

== Local electoral areas and municipal districts ==
County Sligo is divided into borough and municipal districts and LEAs, defined by electoral divisions. The municipal district which contains the administrative area of the former borough of Sligo is referred to as a borough district.

| Municipal District | LEA | Definition | Seats |
|---|---|---|---|
| Borough District of Sligo | Sligo–Strandhill | Knockaree, Sligo East, Sligo North and Sligo West | 6 |
| Ballymote–Tobercurry | | Achonry East, Achonry West, Aclare, Aghanagh, Annagh, Aughris, Ballymote, Ballynakill, Ballynashee, Banada, Branchfield, Breencorragh, Bricklieve, Buncrowey, Carrickbanagher, Carrownaskeagh, Cartron, Castleconor East, Castleconor West, Cloonacool, Cloonoghill, Coolaney, Coolavin, Cuilmore, Dromard East, Dromard West, Dromore, Drumcolumb, Drumfin, Drumrat, Easky East, Easky West, Glendarragh, Kilfree, Kilglass, Killadoon, Killaraght, Kilmacteige, Kilmactranny, Kilshalvy, Kilturra, Lakeview, Leitrim, Lisconny, Loughil, Mullagheruse, Owenmore, Rathmacurkey, Riverstown, Shancough, Skreen, Streamstown, Temple, Templeboy North, Templeboy South, Templevanny, Tobercurry, Toberpatrick East, Toberpatrick West and Toomour | 7 |
| Sligo–Drumcliff | | Ballintogher East, Ballintogher West, Ballysadare East, Ballysadare West, Calry, Carney, Cliffony North, Cliffony South, Collooney, Drumcliff East, Drumcliff West, Glencar, Kilmacowen, Lissadill East, Lissadill North, Lissadill West, Rossinver East and Rossinver West | 7 |

== Councillors ==
=== 2024 seats summary ===
| Party | Seats |
|---|---|
| Fianna Fáil | 6 |
| Fine Gael | 4 |
| Sinn Féin | 3 |
| Labour | 1 |
| PBP–Solidarity | 1 |
| Independent | 4 |

=== Councillors by electoral area ===
This list reflects the order in which councillors were elected on 7 June 2024.

Council members from 2024 election
| LEA | Name | Party |
|---|---|---|
| Ballymote–Tubbercurry | Paul Taylor | Fianna Fáil |
| Ballymote–Tubbercurry | Joe Queenan (Note: Changed party, see table below for details.) | Independent |
| Ballymote–Tubbercurry | Michael Clarke | Independent |
| Ballymote–Tubbercurry | Dara Mulvey | Fine Gael |
| Ballymote–Tubbercurry | Gerard Mullaney | Fine Gael |
| Ballymote–Tubbercurry | Liam Brennan | Fianna Fáil |
| Ballymote–Tubbercurry | Barry Gallagher | Fianna Fáil |
| Sligo–Drumcliff | Thomas Healy | Sinn Féin |
| Sligo–Drumcliff | Edel McSharry | Fianna Fáil |
| Sligo–Drumcliff | Thomas Walsh | Fine Gael |
| Sligo–Drumcliff | Marie Casserly | Independent |
| Sligo–Drumcliff | Dónal Gilroy | Fianna Fáil |
| Sligo–Strandhill | Declan Bree | Independent |
| Sligo–Strandhill | Tom MacSharry (Note: Replaced during term, see table below for details.) | Fianna Fáil |
| Sligo–Strandhill | Nessa Cosgrove | Labour |
| Sligo–Strandhill | Arthur Gibbons | Sinn Féin |
| Sligo–Strandhill | Fergal Nealon | Fine Gael |
| Sligo–Strandhill | Gino O'Boyle | PBP–Solidarity |

==== Co-options ====
| Party | Outgoing | LEA | Reason | Date | Co-optee |
|---|---|---|---|---|---|
| Labour | Nessa Cosgrove | Sligo–Strandhill | Elected to 27th Seanad at the 2025 Seanad election | 18 February 2025 | Ann Higgins |
| Fianna Fáil | Tom MacSharry | Sligo–Strandhill | Appointed District Court Judge | 12 May 2026 | Seamus Kilgannon |

==== Changes in affiliation ====
| Name | LEA | Elected as | New affiliation | Date |
|---|---|---|---|---|
| Michael Clarke | Ballymote–Tubbercurry | Independent | Independent Ireland | 17 October 2024 |
| Joe Queenan | Ballymote–Tubbercurry | Independent | Fianna Fáil | 2 July 2026 |
