= Eamon Scanlon =

Irish politician (born 1954)

Eamon Scanlon TD
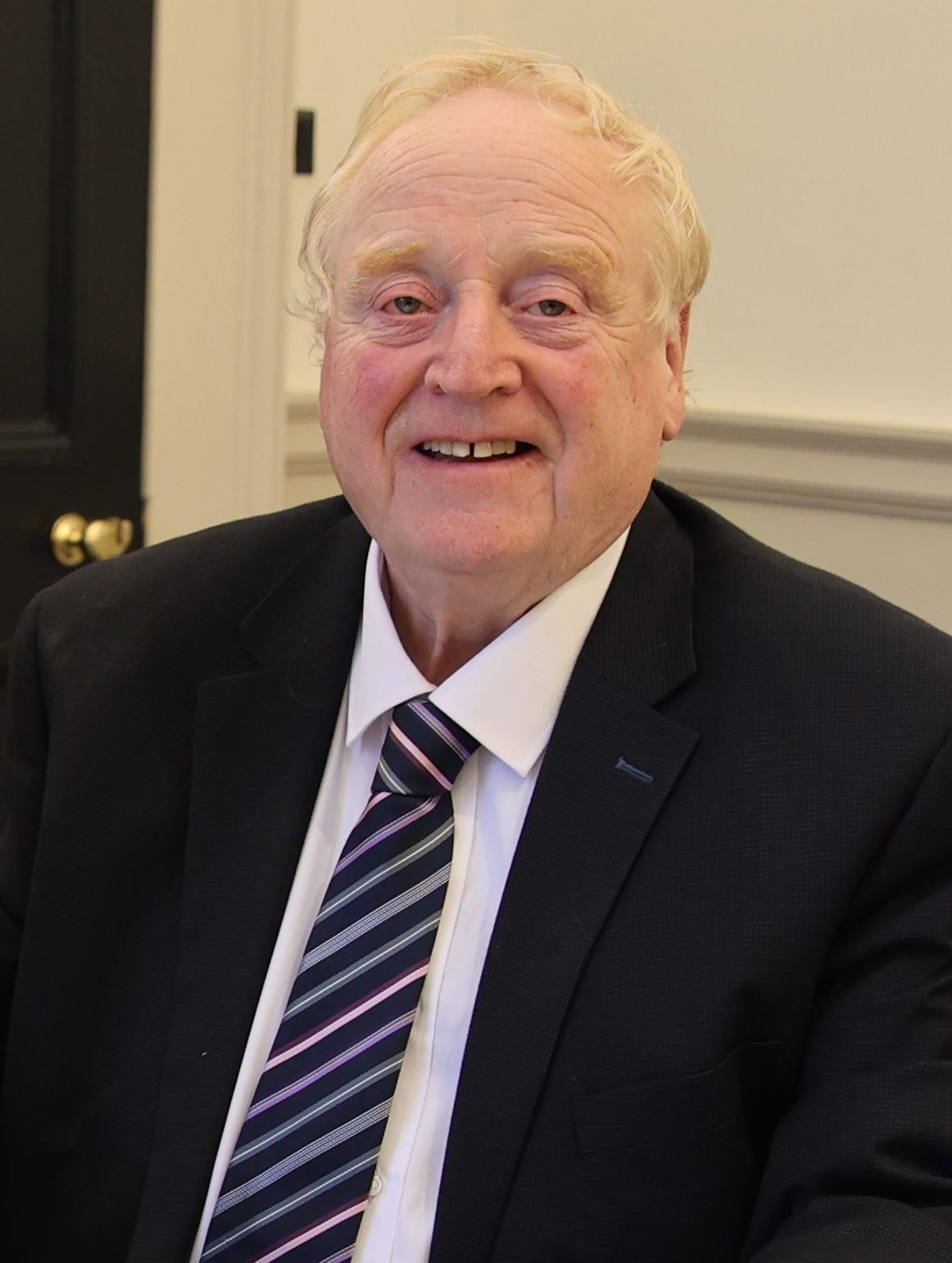
- Scanlon in 2024

Teachta Dála
- Incumbent
- Assumed office November 2024
- In office February 2016 – February 2020
- Constituency: Sligo–Leitrim
- In office June 2007 – February 2011
- Constituency: Sligo–North Leitrim

Senator
- In office 12 September 2002 – 24 May 2007
- Constituency: Agricultural Panel

Personal details
- Born: 20 September 1954 (age 71) Ballymote, County Sligo, Ireland
- Party: Fianna Fáil
- Spouse: Ann Killoran
- Children: 6
- Education: Letterkenny Institute of Technology
- Website: eamonscanlon.jigsy.com

Eamon Scanlon (born 20 September 1954) is an Irish Fianna Fáil politician who served as a Teachta Dála (TD) from 2007 to 2011 and 2016 to 2020 and again since 2024. He was a Senator for the Agricultural Panel from 2002 to 2007.

== Personal life ==
Scanlon is from Ballymote, County Sligo. He is married to Ann Scanlon and they have six children. He is a butcher by trade and business owner since 1975. He subsequently, opened a business, which he now runs with his son, Matthew called 'E & M Scanlon Auctioneers, Valuers and Estate Agents'. He is a member of the Governing Body of Letterkenny Institute of Technology and the Ballymote Community Enterprise Board.

== Political life ==
He spent seven years on the National Executive of Fianna Fáil and was the Director of Elections for Matt Brennan. He was a member of Sligo County Council from 1991 to 2003, representing the Ballymote local electoral area. He was elected to the 22nd Seanad as a Senator for the Agricultural Panel in 2002. He was first elected to Dáil Éireann at the 2007 general election as a Fianna Fáil TD for Sligo–North Leitrim.

On 5 August 2009, he (along with fellow Sligo Fianna Fáil TD Jimmy Devins) resigned the party whip over his opposition to cuts in breast cancer services at Sligo University Hospital. He rejoined the parliamentary party on 13 January 2011.

He lost his seat at the 2011 general election. His first preference vote had declined from 23.2% in 2007 to 11.4%. He was an unsuccessful candidate at 2011 Seanad election.

He was elected to Sligo County Council for the Ballymote-Tubbercurry local electoral area at the 2014 local elections.

He regained his Dáil seat for Fianna Fáil at the 2016 general election. He lost his seat again at the 2020 general election.

At the 2024 general election, Scanlon was elected to the Dáil.

Dáil	Election	Deputy (Party)	Deputy (Party)	Deputy (Party)
30th	2007	Jimmy Devins (FF)	Eamon Scanlon (FF)	John Perry (FG)
31st	2011	Michael Colreavy (SF)	Tony McLoughlin (FG)	John Perry (FG)
32nd	2016	Constituency abolished. See Sligo–Leitrim		

Dáil	Election	Deputy (Party)	Deputy (Party)	Deputy (Party)	Deputy (Party)	Deputy (Party)
13th	1948	Eugene Gilbride (FF)	Stephen Flynn (FF)	Bernard Maguire (Ind.)	Mary Reynolds (FG)	Joseph Roddy (FG)
14th	1951	Eugene Gilbride (FF)	Stephen Flynn (FF)	Patrick Rogers (FG)	Mary Reynolds (FG)	Joseph Roddy (FG)
15th	1954	Eugene Gilbride (FF)	Stephen Flynn (FF)	Bernard Maguire (Ind.)	Mary Reynolds (FG)	Joseph Roddy (FG)
16th	1957	Eugene Gilbride (FF)	Stephen Flynn (FF)	John Joe McGirl (SF)	Mary Reynolds (FG)	Patrick Rogers (FG)
16th	1961 by-election	Eugene Gilbride (FF)	Joseph McLoughlin (FG)	John Joe McGirl (SF)	Mary Reynolds (FG)	Patrick Rogers (FG)
17th	1961	Eugene Gilbride (FF)	Joseph McLoughlin (FG)	James Gallagher (FF)	Eugene Gilhawley (FG)	4 seats 1961–1969
18th	1965	Eugene Gilbride (FF)	Joseph McLoughlin (FG)	James Gallagher (FF)	Eugene Gilhawley (FG)	4 seats 1961–1969
19th	1969	Ray MacSharry (FF)	Joseph McLoughlin (FG)	James Gallagher (FF)	3 seats 1969–1981	
20th	1973	Ray MacSharry (FF)	Joseph McLoughlin (FG)	Eugene Gilhawley (FG)	3 seats 1969–1981	
21st	1977	Ray MacSharry (FF)	James Gallagher (FF)	Eugene Gilhawley (FG)	3 seats 1969–1981	
22nd	1981	Ray MacSharry (FF)	John Ellis (FF)	Joe McCartin (FG)	Ted Nealon (FG)	4 seats 1981–2007
23rd	1982 (Feb)	Ray MacSharry (FF)	John Ellis (FF)	Matt Brennan (FF)	Ted Nealon (FG)	4 seats 1981–2007
24th	1982 (Nov)	Ray MacSharry (FF)	Joe McCartin (FG)	Matt Brennan (FF)	Ted Nealon (FG)	4 seats 1981–2007
25th	1987	Ray MacSharry (FF)	John Ellis (FF)	Matt Brennan (FF)	Ted Nealon (FG)	4 seats 1981–2007
26th	1989	Gerry Reynolds (FG)	John Ellis (FF)	Matt Brennan (FF)	Ted Nealon (FG)	4 seats 1981–2007
27th	1992	Declan Bree (Lab)	John Ellis (FF)	Matt Brennan (FF)	Ted Nealon (FG)	4 seats 1981–2007
28th	1997	Gerry Reynolds (FG)	John Ellis (FF)	Matt Brennan (FF)	John Perry (FG)	4 seats 1981–2007
29th	2002	Marian Harkin (Ind.)	John Ellis (FF)	Jimmy Devins (FF)	John Perry (FG)	4 seats 1981–2007
30th	2007	Constituency abolished. See Sligo–North Leitrim and Roscommon–South Leitrim				

Dáil	Election	Deputy (Party)	Deputy (Party)	Deputy (Party)	Deputy (Party)
32nd	2016	Martin Kenny (SF)	Marc MacSharry (FF)	Eamon Scanlon (FF)	Tony McLoughlin (FG)
33rd	2020	Martin Kenny (SF)	Marc MacSharry (FF)	Marian Harkin (Ind.)	Frank Feighan (FG)
34th	2024	Martin Kenny (SF)	Eamon Scanlon (FF)	Marian Harkin (Ind.)	Frank Feighan (FG)
