= Seán MacManus (politician) =

Irish politician

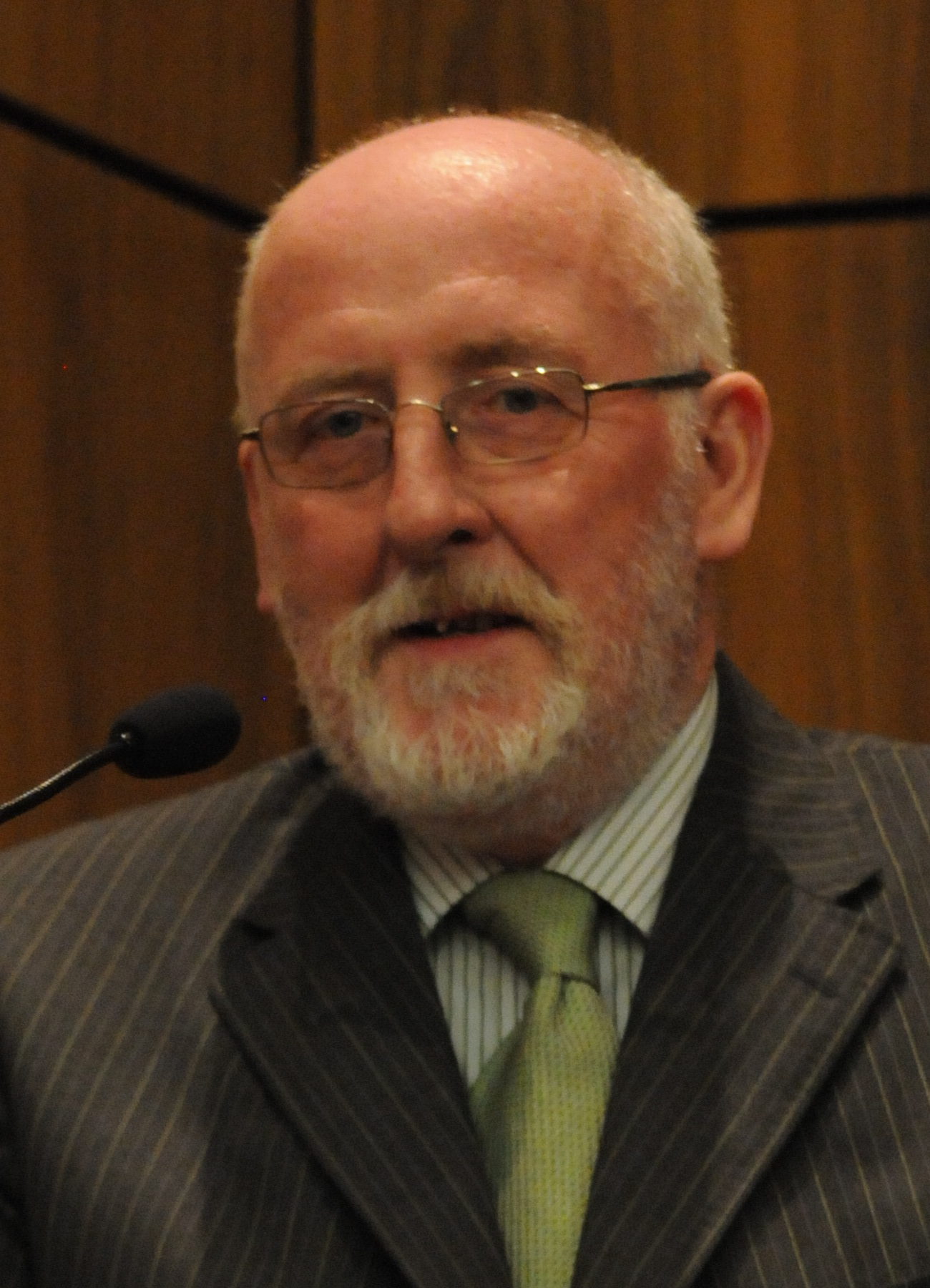
- MacManus in 2011

Sligo County Councillor
- In office 1999–2017
- Constituency: Sligo

Chairperson of Sinn Féin
- In office 1984–1990
- Preceded by: Position created
- Succeeded by: Tom Hartley

Personal details
- Born: 1950 (age 75–76) Blacklion, County Cavan, Ireland
- Party: Sinn Féin
- Children: Joseph MacManus; Chris MacManus

Seán MacManus is an Irish Sinn Féin politician, and was the national chairperson of the party from 1984 to 1990.

== Background ==
MacManus was born in 1950 near Blacklion, a village in the north-west of County Cavan in Ireland, and moved to London in the 1960s to find work. There he met and married Helen McGovern, a native of Glenfarne, County Leitrim. In 1976, he returned to Ireland and settled in the Maugheraboy area of Sligo so that their family of two boys could be educated in Ireland.

Still based in Maugheraboy, MacManus has been involved in Irish Republican politics since the early 1970s and was secretary of the County Sligo Anti-H-Block Committee which campaigned in support of the 1980 and 1981 hunger strikes. He became a member of the Sinn Féin Ard Comhairle (National Executive) in 1982 and remained there for over twenty years. MacManus was elected as the first Sinn Féin National Chairperson, serving from 1984 until 1990. After the IRA ceasefire in 1994, MacManus was part of the first formal and publicly acknowledged Sinn Féin delegation to meet with the British government in over seventy years. He was also involved in the protracted negotiations leading to the Good Friday Agreement.

First elected to Sligo Corporation (later called Sligo Borough Council) in 1994, he remained until the council's abolition in May 2014. He was elected to Sligo County Council in 1999 and was re-elected in 2004, 2009 and 2014. He was also a candidate for the Sligo–Leitrim constituency at several general elections. MacManus stepped down from elected politics in February 2017 and was replaced by his son, Chris MacManus.

In 2000, MacManus became the mayor of Sligo Town, the first Sinn Féin mayor in the Republic of Ireland since the beginning of The Troubles in 1969. He was again elected mayor in 2003.

== Republican family ==
MacManus has two sons. Chris MacManus, the youngest, was also an elected member of Sligo Borough Council and Sligo County Council and has been a member of the European Parliament since March 2020. His eldest son, Joseph MacManus, was a Provisional IRA volunteer who was killed in a shoot-out against an off-duty UDR soldier in Belleek, County Fermanagh, in February 1992.

Party political offices
Preceded by New position	Chairperson of Sinn Féin; 1984–1990	Succeeded by Tom Hartley
