= Declan Bree =

Irish politician (born 1951)

Cllr Declan Bree
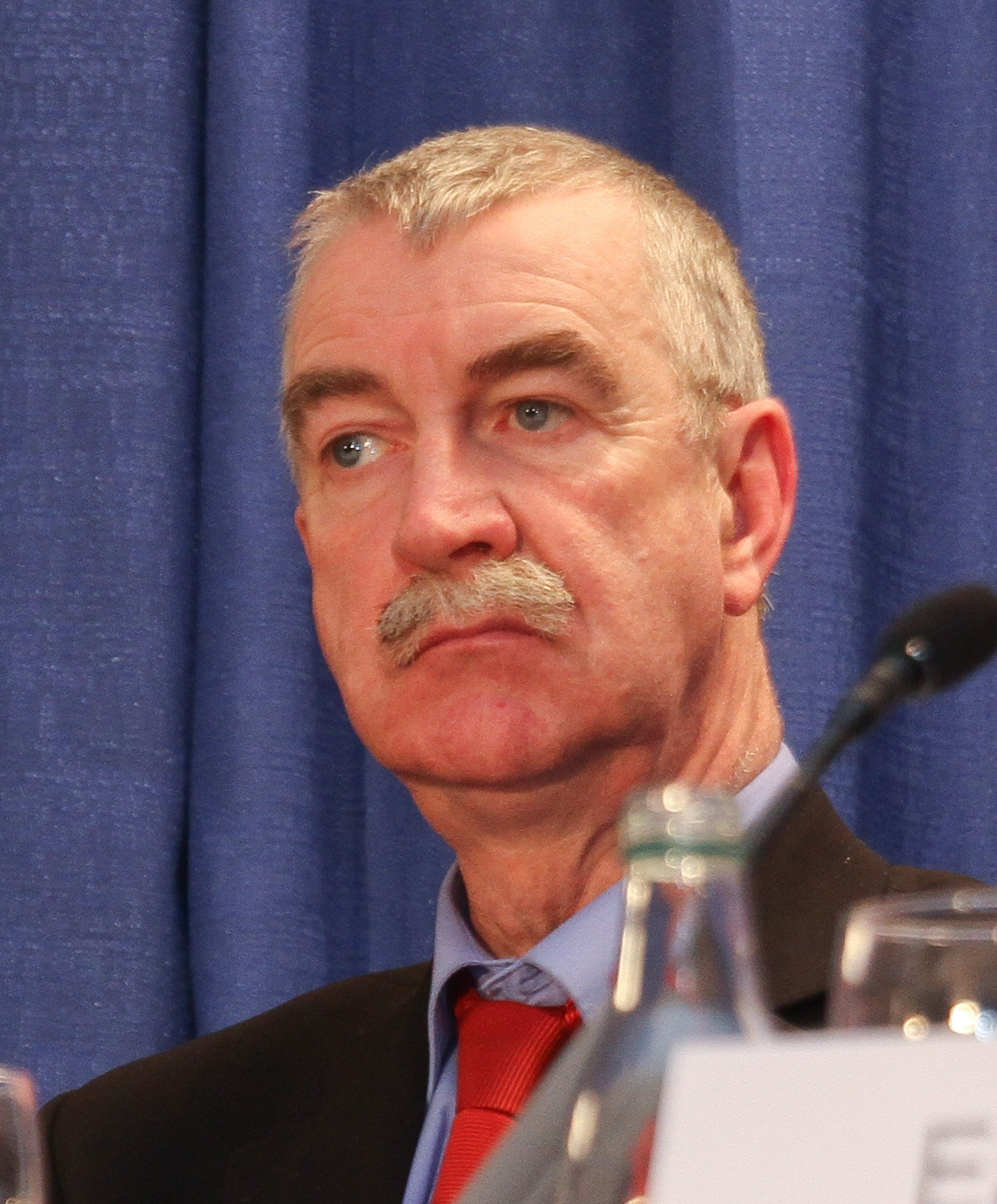
- Bree in 2011

Sligo County Councillor
- Incumbent
- Assumed office 18 June 1974
- Constituency: Sligo Strandhill

Teachta Dála
- In office November 1992 – June 1997
- Constituency: Sligo–Leitrim

Personal details
- Born: 1 July 1951 (age 75)
- Party: Independent (2024–present)
- Other political affiliations: Labour Party (1991–2007); Sligo–Leitrim Independent Socialist Organisation (1974–1991); United Left (2013–2015); Independents 4 Change (2016–2024)
- Website: www.declanbree.com

Declan Bree (born 1 July 1951) is an Irish independent politician. He was a founder of the Sligo–Leitrim Independent Socialist Organisation in 1974, and was a member of that group until joining the Labour Party in 1991. He served in Dáil Éireann from 1992 to 1997. In May 2007 Bree resigned from the Labour Party, citing his disagreement with their pre-electoral pact with Fine Gael, and his clashes with party leader Pat Rabbitte.

== Political career ==
He was first elected to Sligo Corporation and Sligo County Council in 1974 and has retained his seat on both authorities at each subsequent election (the former was abolished as a separate authority in 2014). He was Mayor of Sligo in 2004 and was Chairman of Sligo County Council in 1986.

He is a former Chairman of the Health Service Executive's Regional Health Forum West, and he is also Chairman of the Western River Basin Advisory Council.

A member of Ireland's radical socialist youth organisation the Connolly Youth Movement in the late 1960s and early 1970s, he went on to become National Chairperson of the movement. A founder and former chairperson and General Secretary of the Sligo–Leitrim Independent Socialist Organisation he has been a lifelong political activist.

He was the Sligo–Leitrim Campaign Director in both divorce referendum campaigns and he was a lifelong member of the Irish Anti-Apartheid Movement.

He was the Secretary of the National Association of Labour Councillors, President of the Connolly Forum (Sligo) and he is also Secretary of the Gralton Labour History Committee (Leitrim). He is a patron of People's Movement, which campaigned against the Lisbon Treaty.

An active trade unionist he is a former member of the Western branch Committee of the Federated Workers Union of Ireland. He is a member of the Sligo branch of SIPTU. He is also a member of the Executive of the Local Authority Members Association.

Involved in numerous voluntary and cultural organisations over the years he is a member of Comhaltas Ceoltóirí Éireann, a former Sligo County Secretary of Comhaltas, and was Cathaoirleach of the host branch of Comhaltas when Fleadh Cheoil na hÉireann was awarded to Sligo. He is currently a member of the Board of Directors of the Hawk's Well Theatre and a member of the Board of the Model:Niland Gallery.

The State military files released last year after 30 years which highlighted the whereabouts and activities of suspected 'subversives', included Bree as well as other prominent activists such as Tomás Mac Giolla, Cathal Goulding, James Kelly and Ruairí Ó Brádaigh. Bree, in answer to this new notoriety, said 'This reflected the general paranoia of Church and State in the Ireland during the 60s and 70s, and "Practically everyone active in left wing politics at the time was considered dangerous and subversive," he added.

He first stood for election to Dáil Éireann as an Independent candidate at the 1977 general election for Sligo–Leitrim, but was not elected. He also unsuccessfully stood there at the 1981, February 1982, November 1982, 1987 and 1989 general elections. After joining the Labour Party, he was finally elected to the Dáil as a Labour Teachta Dála (TD) at the 1992 general election for Sligo–Leitrim. He lost his seat at the 1997 general election. He stood again at the 2002 general election but was not elected.

At the 2004 Labour Party annual conference, Bree argued against the pre-electoral pact with the centre-right Fine Gael party. In autumn 2005 Bree, a strong supporter of Travellers' rights, clashed with Labour leader Pat Rabbitte over the issue of Traveller accommodation in Sligo.

A 2009 report, commissioned after a walk-out by officials of Sligo Borough Council, found that remarks made at that meeting by him in relation to the proposed funding of a footbridge from a private development at Swan Point to Markievicz Road were "inappropriate and bullying". Bree said that he stood by what he said.

Bree was involved in negotiations to set up the United Left Alliance in November 2010, but due to disagreements he did not join initially, but did in February 2011 run for the alliance unsuccessfully at the 2011 general election in Sligo–North Leitrim. At the 2016 general election he stood again in the reconstituted Sligo–Leitrim constituency, but again was not elected. Bree stood at the 2020 general election for Independents 4 Change, but was not elected.

== Personal life ==
President of Ireland Catherine Connolly is Bree's sister-in-law.

Dáil	Election	Deputy (Party)	Deputy (Party)	Deputy (Party)	Deputy (Party)	Deputy (Party)
13th	1948	Eugene Gilbride (FF)	Stephen Flynn (FF)	Bernard Maguire (Ind.)	Mary Reynolds (FG)	Joseph Roddy (FG)
14th	1951	Eugene Gilbride (FF)	Stephen Flynn (FF)	Patrick Rogers (FG)	Mary Reynolds (FG)	Joseph Roddy (FG)
15th	1954	Eugene Gilbride (FF)	Stephen Flynn (FF)	Bernard Maguire (Ind.)	Mary Reynolds (FG)	Joseph Roddy (FG)
16th	1957	Eugene Gilbride (FF)	Stephen Flynn (FF)	John Joe McGirl (SF)	Mary Reynolds (FG)	Patrick Rogers (FG)
16th	1961 by-election	Eugene Gilbride (FF)	Joseph McLoughlin (FG)	John Joe McGirl (SF)	Mary Reynolds (FG)	Patrick Rogers (FG)
17th	1961	Eugene Gilbride (FF)	Joseph McLoughlin (FG)	James Gallagher (FF)	Eugene Gilhawley (FG)	4 seats 1961–1969
18th	1965	Eugene Gilbride (FF)	Joseph McLoughlin (FG)	James Gallagher (FF)	Eugene Gilhawley (FG)	4 seats 1961–1969
19th	1969	Ray MacSharry (FF)	Joseph McLoughlin (FG)	James Gallagher (FF)	3 seats 1969–1981	
20th	1973	Ray MacSharry (FF)	Joseph McLoughlin (FG)	Eugene Gilhawley (FG)	3 seats 1969–1981	
21st	1977	Ray MacSharry (FF)	James Gallagher (FF)	Eugene Gilhawley (FG)	3 seats 1969–1981	
22nd	1981	Ray MacSharry (FF)	John Ellis (FF)	Joe McCartin (FG)	Ted Nealon (FG)	4 seats 1981–2007
23rd	1982 (Feb)	Ray MacSharry (FF)	John Ellis (FF)	Matt Brennan (FF)	Ted Nealon (FG)	4 seats 1981–2007
24th	1982 (Nov)	Ray MacSharry (FF)	Joe McCartin (FG)	Matt Brennan (FF)	Ted Nealon (FG)	4 seats 1981–2007
25th	1987	Ray MacSharry (FF)	John Ellis (FF)	Matt Brennan (FF)	Ted Nealon (FG)	4 seats 1981–2007
26th	1989	Gerry Reynolds (FG)	John Ellis (FF)	Matt Brennan (FF)	Ted Nealon (FG)	4 seats 1981–2007
27th	1992	Declan Bree (Lab)	John Ellis (FF)	Matt Brennan (FF)	Ted Nealon (FG)	4 seats 1981–2007
28th	1997	Gerry Reynolds (FG)	John Ellis (FF)	Matt Brennan (FF)	John Perry (FG)	4 seats 1981–2007
29th	2002	Marian Harkin (Ind.)	John Ellis (FF)	Jimmy Devins (FF)	John Perry (FG)	4 seats 1981–2007
30th	2007	Constituency abolished. See Sligo–North Leitrim and Roscommon–South Leitrim				

Dáil	Election	Deputy (Party)	Deputy (Party)	Deputy (Party)	Deputy (Party)
32nd	2016	Martin Kenny (SF)	Marc MacSharry (FF)	Eamon Scanlon (FF)	Tony McLoughlin (FG)
33rd	2020	Martin Kenny (SF)	Marc MacSharry (FF)	Marian Harkin (Ind.)	Frank Feighan (FG)
34th	2024	Martin Kenny (SF)	Eamon Scanlon (FF)	Marian Harkin (Ind.)	Frank Feighan (FG)
