= 2024 Roscommon County Council election =

Part of the 2024 Irish local elections

- 7 June 2024

All 18 seats on Roscommon County Council 10 seats needed for a majority
- Area of Roscommon County Council

An election to all 18 seats on Roscommon County Council was held on 7 June 2024 as part of the 2024 Irish local elections. County Roscommon is divided into 3 local electoral areas (LEAs) to elect councillors for a five-year term of office on the electoral system of proportional representation by means of the single transferable vote (PR-STV).

== Retiring incumbents ==
The following councillors did not seek re-election:

Constituency	Departing Councillor	Party	First elected	Date announced
Athlone	Donal Kilduff	Independent	2019	4 April 2024
Boyle	Joe Murphy	Fianna Fáil	2019	26 October 2023
Boyle	John Cummins	Fianna Fáil	1999	18 May 2023
Roscommon	Orla Leyden	Fianna Fáil	2004	21 March 2023
Roscommon	Kathleen Shanagher	Independent	2014	17 November 2023

== Results by party ==
Party	Candidates	Seats	±	1st pref	FPv%	±%
Fianna Fáil	7	5	▼1	7,840	24.64	▼8.49
Fine Gael	6	4	▲2	5,763	18.11	▲1.88
Sinn Féin	6	1	Steady	3,999	12.56	▲5.06
Independent Ireland	2	1	New	2,150	6.75	New
Irish Freedom	1	0	New	274	0.86	New
The Irish People	2	0	New	201	0.63	New
Green	1	0	New	147	0.46	New
Aontú	1	0	New	139	0.43	New
Independent	11	7	▼2	11,131	34.97	▼8.24
Total	37	18	Steady	31,822	100.00	

== Results by LEA ==
*: Outgoing councillor elected in 2019.
†: Outgoing councillor coopted subsequent to the 2019 election.

=== Athlone ===
Athlone: 6 Seats
Party	Candidate	FPv%	Count								
Party	Candidate	FPv%	1	2	3	4	5	6	7	8	9
Independent	Emer Kelly	19.82	1,946								
Independent	Tony Ward	18.19	1,786								
Fine Gael	John Naughten	17.82	1,750								
Independent	Laurence Fallon	12.24	1,202	1,370	1,497						
Fianna Fáil	John Keogh	9.48	931	1,007	1,096	1,248	1,267	1,339	1,442		
Fianna Fáil	James Murray	5.57	547	621	653	660	683	701	710	728	
Sinn Féin	Sam Brooks	5.25	515	579	609	642	647	712	987	1,002	1,078
Fine Gael	Domnick Connolly	4.91	482	547	581	654	683	721	737	743	1,116
Sinn Féin	Joe Harney	4.13	405	430	458	486	493	536			
Independent	Dominic Naughton	2.59	254	325	368	422	433				
Electorate: 15,862 Valid: 9,818 Spoilt: 85 Quota: 1,403 Turnout: 9,903 (62.43%)

=== Boyle ===
Boyle: 6 Seats
Party	Candidate	FPv%	Count									
Party	Candidate	FPv%	1	2	3	4	5	6	7	8	9	10
Independent	Valerie Byrne	13.74%	1,565	1,612	1,663							
Sinn Féin	Leah Cull	12.43%	1,416	1,446	1,609	1,614	1,638					
Independent	Micheál Frain	11.89%	1,355	1,386	1,391	1,392	1,483	1,547	1,837			
Fianna Fáil	Sean Moylan	11.22%	1,278	1,291	1,336	1,342	1,490	1,504	1,557	1,577	1,581	1,758
Independent	Tom Crosby	9.35	1,065	1,088	1,156	1,164	1,181	1,202	1,235	1,254	1,256	1,338
Fine Gael	Dympna Daly Finn	7.70	875	888	896	896	920	954	975	989	990	
Independent Ireland	Paul Forde	7.29	830	920	924	925	948	969	1,019	1,051	1,053	1,196
Fine Gael	Liam Callaghan	6.57	746	762	769	774	817	843	932	992	993	1,377
Sinn Féin	Angela Beirne	5.17%	589	604	648	653	691	745				
Fianna Fáil	Aidan Sampey	3.77%	429	435	440	440						
Sinn Féin	Rory Williams Doyle	3.74%	426	432								
Independent	Sajjid Hussain	3.61%	411	460	471	475	480					
Aontú	Fayiz Alsani	1.23%	140									
The Irish People	Edmund Shanahan	1.08%	123									
Independent	Majid Ali	0.83%	95									
Independent	Caoimhín Ó Miadh	0.40%	46									
Electorate: 19,159 Valid: 11,393 Spoilt: 135 Quota: 1,628 Turnout: 11,528 (60.17%)

=== Roscommon ===
Roscommon: 6 Seats
Party	Candidate	FPv%	Count					
Party	Candidate	FPv%	1	2	3	4	5	6
Fianna Fáil	Paschal Fitzmaurice	17.76	1,853					
Fianna Fáil	Marty McDermott	15.58	1,626					
Independent	Anthony Waldron	13.32	1,390	1,462	1,485	1,645		
Independent Ireland	Nigel Dineen	12.44	1,298	1,361	1,381	1,492		
Fianna Fáil	Larry Brennan	11.48	1,198	1,223	1,279	1,305	1,312	1,393
Fine Gael	Gareth Scahill	11.19	1,168	1,332	1,337	1,385	1,410	1,625
Fine Gael	Robbie McConn	7.12	743	747	769	799	806	842
Sinn Féin	Christine McDonagh	6.32	659	684	689	741	768	
Irish Freedom	Justin Slamen	2.61	272	276	277			
Green	Paul Hester	1.45	151	154	155			
The Irish People	Cathal Finnegan	0.73	76	78	80			
Electorate: 17,969 Valid: 10,434 Spoilt: 102 Quota: 1,491 Turnout: 10,536 (58.63%)

== Changes after 2024 ==
=== Co-option ===
Party	Outgoing	LEA	Reason	Date	Co-optee
Fine Gael	John Naughten	Athlone	Death	October 2024	Valerie Duffy
