= 1991 Roscommon County Council election =

Part of the 1991 Irish local elections

← 1985	27 June 1991	1999 →

All 26 seats on Roscommon County Council
	First party	Second party	Third party
Party	Fine Gael	Fianna Fáil	Independent
Seats won	11	10	5
Seat change	+3	-3	-
- Map showing the area of Roscommon County Council
Council control after election
TBD

An election to Roscommon County Council took place on 27 June 1991 as part of that year's Irish local elections. 26 councillors were elected from six local electoral areas (LEAs) for a five-year term of office on the electoral system of proportional representation by means of the single transferable vote (PR-STV). This term was extended twice, first to 1998, then to 1999.

== Results by party ==
Party	Seats	±	First Pref. votes	FPv%	±%
Fine Gael	11	+3	11,229	40.33	
Fianna Fáil	10	-3	11,177	40.15	
Independent	5	-	4,934	17.72	
Totals	26	-	27,840	100.00	—

== Results by local electoral area ==
=== Athlone ===
Athlone - 4 seats
Party	Candidate	FPv%	Count			
Party	Candidate	FPv%	1	2	3	4
Fianna Fáil	Senator Michael Finneran*	31.4%	1,635			
Fine Gael	Senator Liam Naughten*	30.5%	1,586			
Fine Gael	Paddy Moore	16.2%	841	996	1,405	
Fianna Fáil	Jim Morris*	11.4%	592	857	904	980
Fianna Fáil	Michael O'Faolain	10.6%	550	724	813	907
Electorate: 7,034 Valid: 5,204 (73.98%) Spoilt: 29 Quota: 1,041 Turnout: 5,233 (74.40%)

=== Ballaghadreen ===
Ballaghadreen - 4 seats
Party	Candidate	FPv%	Count			
Party	Candidate	FPv%	1	2	3	4
Fine Gael	Michael Scally	20.69	1,112			
Fine Gael	John Connor*	20.6%	839			
Fianna Fáil	Paul Lynch*	14.7%	599	672	743	795
Fianna Fáil	Patrick Dooney*	13.5%	550	630	690	803
Independent	Dermot Allman	10.6%	430	484	552	652
Independent	Tom McGarry*	7.0%	286	351	389	
Fianna Fáil	Joe Creighton	6.2%	252	277		
Electorate: 5,583 Valid: 4,068 (62.04%) Spoilt: 59 Quota: 815 Turnout: 4,098 (73.4%)

=== Boyle ===
Boyle - 5 seats
Party	Candidate	FPv%	Count				
Party	Candidate	FPv%	1	2	3	4	5
Fine Gael	Kitty Duignan*	16.4%	813	985			
Independent	Paul Beirne	8.40	775	840			
Fine Gael	Charlie Hopkins	13.5%	671	733	802	844	
Fine Gael	Joseph O'Beirne	10.7%	529	543	587	599	726
Fianna Fáil	Colm O'Donnell*	10.7%	529	537	545	649	814
Fianna Fáil	Sean McQuaid*	9.2%	457	479	498	627	792
Fianna Fáil	Tommy Kelly	9.1%	452	452	454	519	
Fianna Fáil	Mary Clifford	7.4%	369	390	396		
Fine Gael	Michael Carty	7.4%	368				
Electorate: 6,959 Valid: 4,963 (71.32%) Spoilt: 41 Quota: 828 Turnout: 5,004 (71.91%)

=== Castlerea ===
Castlerea - 4 seats
Party	Candidate	FPv%	Count			
Party	Candidate	FPv%	1	2	3	4
Fine Gael	Michael McGreal*	19.8%	748	793		
Fine Gael	Tom Callaghan	15.9%	600	608	648	752
Independent	Patrick Moylan*	15.5%	583	649	684	787
Independent	Danny Burke	15.4%	579	598	644	756
Fianna Fáil	Tony Waldron	10.1%	382	432	570	623
Independent	Paddy Concannon*	9.9%	372	381	410	
Fianna Fáil	Liam Satchwell	6.8%	257	300		
Fianna Fáil	Seamus Sloyan	6.6%	250			
Electorate: 5,175 Valid: 3,771 (72.87%) Spoilt: 34 Quota: 755 Turnout: 3,805 (73.53%)

=== Roscommon ===
Roscommon - 5 seats
Party	Candidate	FPv%	Count					
Party	Candidate	FPv%	1	2	3	4	5	6
Independent	Tom Foxe TD	22.01	1,232					
Independent	Eithne Quinn*	13.3%	677	890				
Fianna Fáil	Des Bruen*	12.0%	608	656	746	799	923	
Fine Gael	Dominic Connolly	11.4%	578	607	654	745	765	767
Fianna Fáil	Seamus McDermott	9.4%	476	506	538	575	664	719
Fianna Fáil	Paddy Kilduff	8.7%	439	450	498	523		
Fine Gael	Gerry Donnelly	8.6%	436	450	493	604	784	802
Fine Gael	Patrick Walshe*	6.5%	331	363	377			
Fianna Fáil	Anthony Murray*	5.8%	295	304				
Electorate: 7,411 Valid: 5,072 (68.44%) Spoilt: 36 Quota: 846 Turnout: 5,108 (68.92%)

=== Strokestown ===
Strokestown - 4 seats
Party	Candidate	FPv%	Count		
Party	Candidate	FPv%	1	2	3
Fianna Fáil	Senator Brian Mullooly*	18.9%	899	937	1,059
Fianna Fáil	Eugene Murphy*	17.4%	827	928	1,014
Fine Gael	Seán Beirne*	16.2%	773	881	970
Fianna Fáil	Tom Crosby	15.9%	759	818	909
Fine Gael	Noel Collins	12.9%	614	657	722
Republican Sinn Féin	Dermot Mullooly	10.5%	500	525	
Fine Gael	Frank Curley	8.2%	390		
Electorate: 7,411 Valid: 5,072 (68.44%) Spoilt: 36 Quota: 846 Turnout: 5,108 (68.92%)
