= 2014 Roscommon County Council election =

Part of the 2014 Irish local elections

← 2009	23 May 2014	2019 →

All 18 seats on Roscommon County Council 10 seats needed for a majority
	First party	Second party	Third party
Party	Fianna Fáil	Fine Gael	Sinn Féin
Seats won	8	3	1
Seat change	-	-7	-
	Fourth party
Party	Independent
Seats won	6
Seat change	-1
- Map showing the area of Roscommon County Council

An election for all 18 seats to Roscommon County Council took place on 23 May 2014 as part of the 2014 Irish local elections, a reduction from 26 seats at the 2009 election. County Roscommon was divided into three local electoral areas (LEAs) to elect councillors for a five-year term of office on the electoral system of proportional representation by means of the single transferable vote (PR-STV). In addition, the town council of Boyle was abolished.

Fine Gael lost 7 seats, including a number of long-serving councillors; due to voter anger over continuous boil water notices and the closure of the Accident and Emergency Department at Roscommon University Hospital; the latter leading to a split in the party locally. Fianna Fáil and Independents performed well in the election with the former becoming the largest party in Roscommon for the first time since 1985.

== Results by party ==
Party	Seats	±	1st pref	FPv%	±%
Fianna Fáil	8	-	10,822	34.53	
Fine Gael	3	-7	7,026	22.42	
Sinn Féin	1	-	2,542	8.11	
Independent	6	-1	10,361	33.06	
Total	18	-8	30,751	100.00	—

== Results by local electoral area ==
*: Outgoing councillor.

=== Athlone ===
Athlone: 6 seats
Party	Candidate	FPv%	Count				
Party	Candidate	FPv%	1	2	3	4	5
Independent	Tony Ward	17.62	1,712				
Fianna Fáil	Ivan Connaughton††††	14.56	1,414				
Fine Gael	John Naughten	12.71	1,235	1,298	1,309	1,414	
Fianna Fáil	John Keogh	11.52	1,119	1,158	1,176	1,271	1,379
Independent	Laurence Fallon	10.76	1,045	1,102	1,111	1,287	1,458
Fianna Fáil	Paddy Kilduff	10.13	984	1,026	1,034	1,111	1,183
Fine Gael	Ollie Moore	8.73	848	882	892	923	988
Sinn Féin	David McWeeney	6.64	645	675	703	759	
Independent	Anthony Geraghty	3.78	367	399	426		
Independent	Peadar Doyle	2.11	205	217	237		
Independent	Gordon Hudson	1.44	140	155	155		
Electorate: 14,519 Valid: 9,714 (66.91%) Spoilt: 109 Quota: 1,401 Turnout: 9,823 (67.66%)

=== Boyle ===
Boyle: 6 seats
Party	Candidate	FPv%	Count							
Party	Candidate	FPv%	1	2	3	4	5	6	7	8
Fianna Fáil	John Cummins	13.16	1,513	1,535	1,582	1,628	1,643			
Independent	Valerie Byrne	11.71	1,347	1,442	1,461	1,578	1,619	1,777		
Sinn Féin	Patrick Michael Mulligan	10.88	1,251	1,283	1,362	1,406	1,614	1,639	1,640	1,727
Fianna Fáil	Eugene Murphy	9.99	1,149	1,163	1,178	1,289	1,310	1,381	1,406	1,463
Fianna Fáil	Rachel Doherty	9.28	1,067	1,079	1,131	1,152	1,176	1,296	1,332	1,608
Independent	Tom Crosby	9.23	1,062	1,107	1,112	1,144	1,161	1,207	1,230	1,268
Fine Gael	Maura Hopkins	7.30	840	867	916	1,039	1,287	1,400	1,413	1,729
Fine Gael	Charlie Hopkins	6.36	731	733	734	752	767	929	948	
Fine Gael	Gerry Garvey	5.86	674	680	682	739	754	754		
Fine Gael	Liam Callaghan	5.15	592	606	650					
Labour	Micheál Frain	5.10	587	606	652	696	696			
Fianna Fáil	Aidan Sampey	3.17	365	374	374					
Independent	Gertrude Drury-O'Beirne	1.58	182	182						
Independent	Anthony Brendan Coleman	1.22	140	140						
Electorate: 17,647 Valid: 11,500 (65.17%) Spoilt: 132 Quota: 1,643 Turnout: 11,632 (65.91%)

=== Roscommon ===
Roscommon: 6 seats
Party	Candidate	FPv%	Count								
Party	Candidate	FPv%	1	2	3	4	5	6	7	8	9
Fianna Fáil	Paschal Fitzmaurice	15.03	1,576								
Fianna Fáil	Orla Leyden	10.04	1,053	1,054	1,063	1,070	1,085	1,134	1,241	1,290	1,334
Independent	Kathleen Shanagher	9.17	962	965	966	973	992	1,022	1,211	1,314	1,345
Independent	Dominick Connolly	9.12	957	959	964	983	1,010	1,128	1,295	1,376	1,443
Fianna Fáil	Larry Brennan	9.03	947	947	951	956	973	1,009	1,103	1,140	1,161
Fine Gael	Michael Creaton	8.34	875	876	885	917	959	1,039	1,060	1,120	1,419
Independent	Nigel Dineen	7.58	795	803	822	869	993	1,044	1,113	1,322	1,487
Fine Gael	Michael McGreal	7.23	758	758	762	830	863	892	905	943	
Independent	Paula McNamara	6.59	691	693	694	705	727	762			
Sinn Féin	Séamus O'Brien	6.46	646	650	658	712	799	807	831		
Fine Gael	Seán Beirne	4.51	473	474	474	478	481				
Independent	John Murphy	3.75	393	397	409	449					
Independent	Padraig Morris	3.06	321	327	332						
Independent	Joe Malone	0.40	42								
Electorate: 16,891 Valid: 10,633 (62.10%) Spoilt: 144 Quota: 1,499 Turnout: 10,489 (62.95%)

== Changes ==
=== Co-options ===
Party	Outgoing	LEA	Reason	Date	Co-optee
Fianna Fáil	Eugene Murphy	Boyle	Elected to the 32nd Dáil at the 2016 general election.	18 March 2016	Joe Murphy
Fine Gael	Maura Hopkins	Boyle	Elected to 25th Seanad at the 2016 Seanad election.	July 2016	Liam Callaghan

=== Changes in affiliation ===
Name	LEA	Elected as	New affiliation	Date
Paddy Kilduff	Athlone	Fianna Fáil	Independent	8 February 2018
Ivan Connaughton	Athlone	Fianna Fáil	Independent	13 December 2018
