= Luke 'Ming' Flanagan =

Irish politician (born 1972)

Luke 'Ming' Flanagan MEP
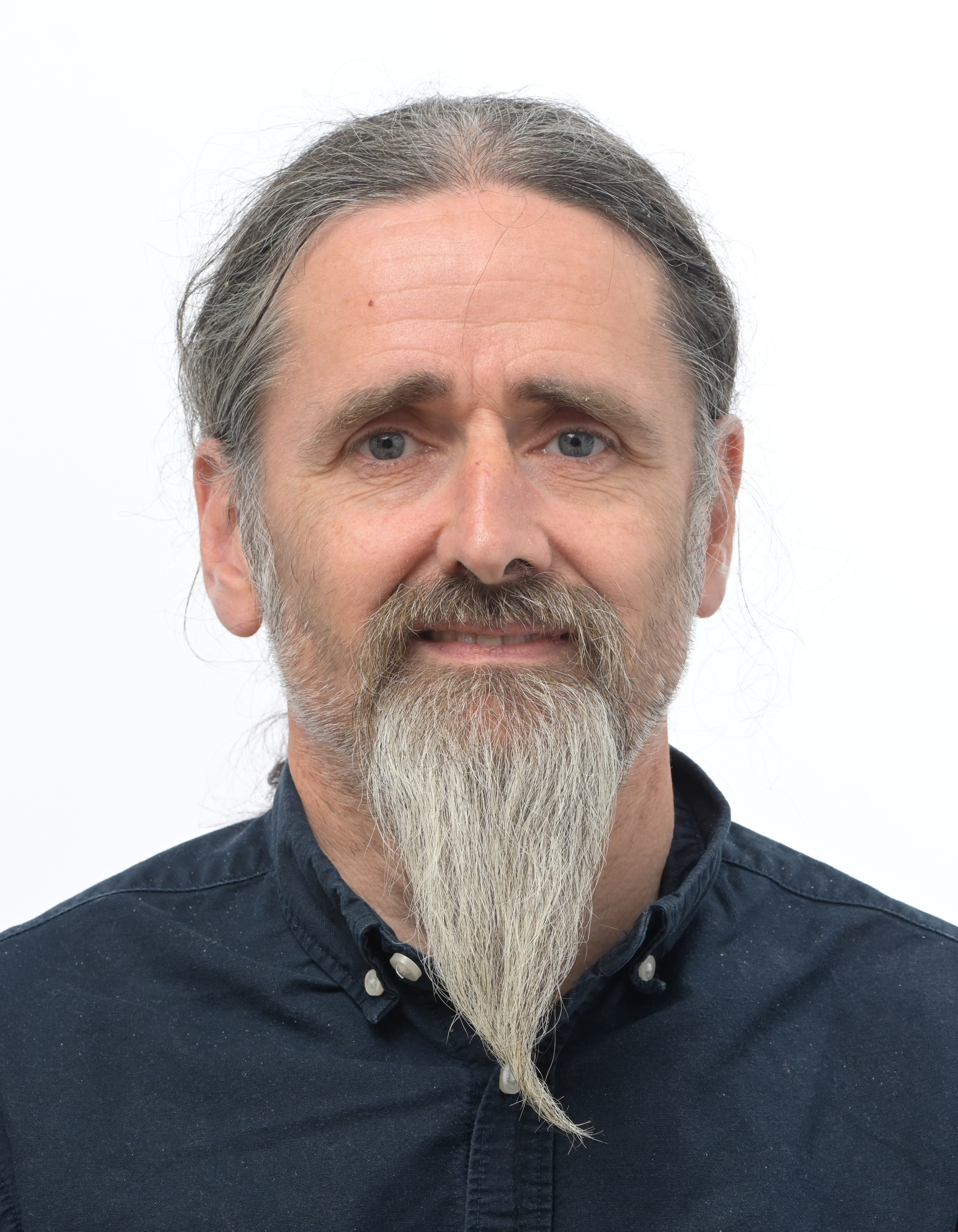
- Flanagan in 2024

Member of the European Parliament
- Incumbent
- Assumed office 1 July 2014
- Constituency: Midlands–North-West

Teachta Dála
- In office February 2011 – May 2014
- Constituency: Roscommon–South Leitrim

Personal details
- Born: Luke Flanagan; 22 January 1972 (age 54) Roscommon, Ireland
- Party: Ireland: Independent; EU: The Left
- Other political affiliations: New Vision (2011)
- Spouse: Judith Flanagan (m. 2002)
- Children: 3

Luke 'Ming' Flanagan (born 22 January 1972) is an Irish politician who has been a Member of the European Parliament (MEP) from Ireland for the Midlands–North-West constituency since 2014. He is an independent, but sits in parliament with The Left in the European Parliament.

Flanagan served as a member of Roscommon County Council between 2004 and 2011. First elected at the 2004 local elections, he was re-elected in 2009, and served as Cathaoirleach of Roscommon from 2010 until his election as a TD for Roscommon–South Leitrim at the 2011 general election. He served in Dáil Éireann for three years before being elected as an Independent candidate for Midlands–North-West at the 2014 European Parliament election. Flanagan is known for his advocacy of the legalisation of cannabis and addressing allegations of corruption in the Garda Síochána.

== Early life, family and education ==
Flanagan was born in Roscommon, Ireland in 1972 to carpenter Luke Flanagan, of Knockroe, Castlerea, and housewife Lily (née Coyne). He was raised in Castlerea.

Flanagan studied science at Galway Regional Technical College for two years, during which he began smoking cannabis. After dropping out, he studied mechanical engineering at Sligo RTC.

== Political career ==
=== Early activism and electoral campaigns ===
Flanagan first sought political office as an independent candidate in Galway West at the 1997 general election, urging the legalisation of cannabis and campaigning against his landlord, Fianna Fáil TD Frank Fahey. He received 548 votes (1.1%). He contested Connacht–Ulster at the 1999 European Parliament election receiving 5,000 votes (1.6%) and Longford–Roscommon at the 2002 general election receiving 779 votes (1.6%). The media did not portray him as a serious candidate, instead focusing on how he shaved his hair and styled his beard in the way of Ming the Merciless from the comic strip Flash Gordon. His posters and other election material featured cannabis leaves, and legalisation of the drug was one of his main policy platforms. He voiced uncompromising support for social and environmental issues, and the combination of his rhetoric and appearance attracted media attention.

In 2001, he attracted attention when he sent more than 200 cannabis joints to the Oireachtas, one for each TD and senator, as part of his campaign to have cannabis legalised.

=== Local office ===
==== Roscommon County Council (2004–2011) ====
Flanagan returned to his native Castlerea, County Roscommon where he was elected at the 2004 Roscommon County Council election, topping the poll and being elected on the first count, defeating sitting councillors John Murray and Danny Burke. He was re-elected on the first count at 2009 Roscommon County Council election, receiving 16.8% of 1st preference votes in the Castlerea electoral area, and exceeding the quota by 394 votes.

==== Cathaoirleach of County Roscommon (2010–2011) ====
On 28 June 2010, Flanagan was elected as cathaoirleach of Roscommon County Council. During his time as chair of the council, he voluntarily took a 50 per cent cut of his allowance and took none of his foreign travel allowance, encouraging other politicians to do so. On 27 July 2010, Flanagan was the subject of debate over his refusal to lead the prayer said before council meetings; he said that it would be hypocritical for him, as a non-believer, to lead it. The matter was later resolved by asking Leas-Chathaoirleach Ernie Keenan to say the prayer.

In December 2010, Flanagan proposed that his allowance should be halved, and many of his other allowances be abolished entirely, in recognition of the financial difficulties that the country and the county were experiencing. The proposal met with a mixed reception from his council colleagues.

=== Dáil Éireann (2011–2014) ===
Flanagan was elected for Roscommon–South Leitrim in the 31st Dáil in the 2011 general election, one of twenty members of the New Vision alliance of independent candidates. He received 8,925 (18.8%) first preference votes, which enabled him to take the first seat with 12,149 votes on the fourth count, while the two incumbent Fine Gael TDs were elected on the sixth count. Neither of the two Fianna Fáil candidates managed to retain the seat of their retiring party colleague, Michael Finneran.

Upon his election, Flanagan took a 50% salary cut and urged his fellow TDs to follow suit. Following his election to the Dáil, Flanagan nominated independent John Murphy to replace him on Roscommon County Council. When he was elected in 2011, Flanagan kept his promise to retain only half of his €92,672 salary and distribute the rest to local projects. He refused to hand it back to the State, claiming it would only be pumped into the banks.

In March 2011, one month after being elected to Dáil Éireann, Flanagan announced that he would cease his smoking of cannabis while in Ireland in order to protect his family and focus on the issues for which he stands. He said he still intended to smoke cannabis when abroad. This followed a formal complaint lodged to the Garda Síochána by a Fianna Fáil councillor from Kilkenny about his cannabis use. Flanagan said: "...my wife and children are the most important people on the planet to me and I don't want my kids to witness the Garda calling to the house." He said he would continue to campaign for the legalisation of cannabis.

In July 2011, Flanagan was linked to an incident in which a Dáil microphone picked up a conversation he had with fellow independent TDs Shane Ross and Mick Wallace. During the exchange the trio appeared to be disparaging the appearance of Fine Gael TD Mary Mitchell O'Connor. Wallace initiated the conversation by saying "Miss Piggy has toned it down a bit today". Flanagan was heard saying "they’d want to ban her wearing pink" and Ross commented that "she normally wears the most garish colours".

On 2 November 2011, Flanagan walked out of the Dáil amid a heated disagreement with Minister for Agriculture, Food and the Marine, Simon Coveney, over turf-cutting rights. Flanagan had observed that his Fine Gael constituency colleague Frank Feighan had promised before the 2011 general election that he would "sign his name in blood" if that was required in order to oppose a turf-cutting ban, with Coveney responding by saying populism was a dangerous thing. Flanagan then said, "Populism and bondholders. I am leaving the chamber"; Coveney then told him to "go on and walk out in protest". Flanagan retorted, "My daddy did not give me a seat." (Coveney had been elected in a by-election after his father Hugh Coveney TD died in an accident in March 1998.)

On 15 December 2011, Flanagan helped launch a nationwide campaign against a proposed household charge being brought in as part of the 2012 Irish budget.

In April 2012, Flanagan stated he would be urging people to vote 'No' in the referendum on ratification of the European Fiscal Compact Treaty, on the grounds that Ireland would lose power to bigger countries in the European Union, such as Germany and France. He also stated that Ireland should leave the economic and monetary union (EMU), based on the euro currency.

Flanagan admitted to "atrocious" timing after calling gardaí "corrupt" on television, as thousands of people gathered for the state funeral of murdered garda Adrian Donohoe in Dundalk, County Louth, in January 2013. In early March 2013, Daniel McConnell of the Sunday Independent reported that Flanagan had been issued with a fine of €60 and two penalty points on his driving licence for operating a mobile phone while driving in June 2011. According to these reports, Flanagan then had his punishment rescinded at a later date with a claim of being 'on Dáil business'. The stories caused controversy at the time, for Flanagan, along with other independent TDs, had been involved in a campaign highlighting the cancellation of 197 Fixed Charge Notices out of the 1.4 million issued, which it was alleged were 'inappropriately' quashed. In the Dáil, Flanagan admitted he twice had penalty points cancelled, though he also asked that they be reinstated.

In June 2013, Flanagan came to prominence as an advocate of turf cutters whose ability to cut turf (peat) was affected by the European Union's Habitats Directive. As part of his advocacy, Flanagan attended a number of turf cutters' protests. Flanagan supports the cutting of turf from bogs including when they are protected as Special Areas of Conservation. Despite a European Union ban, he has cut turf at Cloonchambers Bog near Castlerea, a raised bog which has been designated a Special Area of Conservation.

=== European Parliament (2014–present) ===
On 21 March 2014, Flanagan announced that he would run as an independent candidate for the Midlands–North-West constituency at the 2014 European Parliament election. He ran on an "anti-European Union platform". During the campaign he said, "I'm sick and tired of dealing with the monkey, I want to go and deal with the organ grinder." In a subsequent interview, he cited his experiences advocating for turf-cutting and against bank bail-outs as particular motivations to run for Europe, seeing the opportunity to increase his influence on the issues at the European level. He was elected on 26 May 2014, passing the quota on the second count.

On being elected as an MEP, Flanagan ended his previous policy of only keeping half his salary. At the time this amounted to €95,482 a year before tax and allowances.

In December 2014, Flanagan was named as having the second worst voting record among Irish MEPs at the European Parliament, as determined by VoteWatch Europe and reported in Ireland. He explained that this was as a result of his wife being ill and his children needing him.

He supported a 'Yes' vote in the Thirty-sixth Amendment of the Constitution Bill 2018 to repeal the constitutional ban on abortion.

He was re-elected at the 2019 European Parliament election and again at the 2024 European Parliament election.

== Personal life ==
Flanagan is married to Judith Flanagan, with whom he has three daughters. He identifies as an atheist, and is autistic.

Flanagan has been convicted on several occasions of possession of cannabis for personal use. He served nine days of a 15-day sentence at Loughan House open prison in County Cavan in 1998, for refusing to pay a fine imposed for breach of the Litter Pollution Act, and the following year he served another sentence at Loughan House for possession of cannabis.

Flanagan is also a longtime supporter of English football club Queens Park Rangers F.C.

== Twitter account hack incident ==
In September 2020, Flanagan's Twitter account was hacked and posted a tweet referring to Green Party candidate Saoirse McHugh sexually. In February 2024, his former assistant, Diarmuid Hayes, in the European Parliament admitted in court to having hacked the account and posted the tweet. Hayes had been upset with Flanagan after he had refused to renew his contract following the European Parliament elections in 2019. Hayes was sentenced to community service.

Flanagan told the court his family had been "put through hell" by the incident and that it was a "cold, calculated and skillfully carried out attempt" to destroy him and that he has had to seek therapy after the media lambasted him, "I have to say it was difficult. I suffer from depression. I don't need bad news to make me feel down... I was like going, 'Have I gone crazy? How did this happen?' And then my second thought was any politician who claims that they've been hacked, has never ever been believed. In fact, they've just been ridiculed."

Dáil	Election	Deputy (Party)	Deputy (Party)	Deputy (Party)
30th	2007	Michael Finneran (FF)	Frank Feighan (FG)	Denis Naughten (FG)
31st	2011	Luke 'Ming' Flanagan (Ind.)	Frank Feighan (FG)	Denis Naughten (FG)
31st	2014 by-election	Michael Fitzmaurice (Ind.)	Frank Feighan (FG)	Denis Naughten (FG)
32nd	2016	Constituency abolished. See Roscommon–Galway and Sligo–Leitrim		
