= 1985 Roscommon County Council election =

Part of the 1985 Irish local elections

- 20 June 1985

All 26 seats on Roscommon County Council
	First party	Second party	Third party
Party	Fianna Fáil	Fine Gael	Independent
Seats won	13	8	5
Seat change	+1	-4	+4
	Fourth party
Party	Sinn Féin
Seats won	0
Seat change	-1
- Map showing the area of Roscommon County Council
Council control after election
TBD

An election to Roscommon County Council took place on 20 June 1985 as part of the Irish local elections. 26 councillors were elected from six local electoral areas (LEAs) for a five-year term of office on the electoral system of proportional representation by means of the single transferable vote (PR-STV). This term was extended for a further year, to 1991.

== Results by party ==
Party	Seats	±	First Pref. votes	FPv%	±%
Fianna Fáil	13	+1	13,230	44.86	
Fine Gael	8	-4	10,648	36.10	
Independent	5	+4	4,661	15.80	
Sinn Féin	0	-1	948	3.21	
Totals	26	-	29,495	100.00	—

== Results by local electoral area ==
=== Athlone ===
Athlone: 4 seats
Party	Candidate	FPv%	Count				
Party	Candidate	FPv%	1	2	3	4	5
Fianna Fáil	Michael Finneran*		1,522				
Fine Gael	Liam Naughten TD*		1,379				
Independent	Patrick Lenihan*		1,274				
Fianna Fáil	Jim Morris		448	825	870	905	1,091
Fine Gael	John Joe Grenham*		387	437	627	840	884
Fine Gael	Willie Nestor		208	259	359		
Electorate: 6,686 Valid: 5,218 (78.79%) Spoilt: 50 Quota: 1,044 Turnout: 5,268

=== Ballaghadreen ===
Ballaghadreen: 4 seats
Party	Candidate	FPv%	Count				
Party	Candidate	FPv%	1	2	3	4	5
Fine Gael	Sen. John Connor		881				
Fianna Fáil	Patrick Dooney*		795	806	951		
Fine Gael	Michael Scally		636	793	819	821	832
Fianna Fáil	Paul Lynch		633	656	762	833	834
Independent	Tom McGarry*		568	652	818	830	834
Fianna Fáil	Hubert Maxwell		479	508			
Fine Gael	Michael Gilligan*		332				
Electorate: 6,498 Valid: 4,325 (67.04%) Spoilt: 31 Quota: 866 Turnout: 4,356

=== Boyle ===
Boyle: 5 seats
Party	Candidate	FPv%	Count						
Party	Candidate	FPv%	1	2	3	4	5	6	7
Fianna Fáil	Sean Doherty TD*		1,263						
Fianna Fáil	Sean McQuaid		652	758	797	843	977		
Fianna Fáil	Colm O'Donnell*		595	696	718	765	862	926	
Fine Gael	Thomas Egan*		574	595	705	748	760	761	830
Fine Gael	Charlie Hopkins		514	528	573	619	624	625	680
Fine Gael	Charles Duignan*		500	523	557	575	606	608	909
Fine Gael	John Beirne*		444	458	480	499	579	579	
Fianna Fáil	Timothy Cooney		327	379	383	421			
Sinn Féin	Kevin Earley		296	310	319				
Fine Gael	Connie Fallon		283	292					
Electorate: 7,103 Valid: 5,448 (77.64%) Spoilt: 67 Quota: 909 Turnout: 5,515

=== Castlerea ===
Castlerea: 4 seats
Party	Candidate	FPv%	Count						
Party	Candidate	FPv%	1	2	3	4	5	6	7
Independent	Patrick Moylan*		714	755	845				
Fine Gael	Michael McGreal		579	601	625	634	691	711	713
Independent	Paddy Concannon*		550	553	556	556	668	780	837
Fine Gael	Tom Callaghan*		526	528	528	529	588	657	681
Independent	Tony Waldron		473	481	489	493			
Fianna Fáil	John Costello*		443	446	516	528	665	957	
Fianna Fáil	Liam Satchwell		429	434	498	503	579		
Fianna Fáil	Gerard Regan		263	271					
Independent	Michael Mitchell		96						
Electorate: 5,412 Valid: 4,074 (76.07%) Spoilt: 43 Quota: 815 Turnout: 4,117

=== Roscommon ===
Roscommon: 5 seats
Party	Candidate	FPv%	Count					
Party	Candidate	FPv%	1	2	3	4	5	6
Fianna Fáil	Terry Leyden TD*		1,101					
Independent	Eithne Quinn		986					
Fianna Fáil	Anthony Murray		609	655	670	756	824	930
Fianna Fáil	Des Bruen*		549	632	654	786	806	830
Fine Gael	Patrick Walshe*		515	529	549	580	722	901
Fine Gael	John T. Kirwan		446	453	464	473	526	
Fine Gael	Tom Hunt*		402	418	433	472	581	742
Fianna Fáil	Seamus Keane		382	394	403	429		
Fianna Fáil	Seamus McDermott		316	359	367			
Electorate: 7,607 Valid: 5,312 (70.28%) Spoilt: 34 Quota: 886 Turnout: 5,346

=== Strokestown ===
Strokestown: 4 seats
Party	Candidate	FPv%	Count				
Party	Candidate	FPv%	1	2	3	4	5
Fianna Fáil	Sen. Brian Mullooly*		1,259				
Fine Gael	Seán Beirne		773	765	831	1,054	
Fine Gael	Seamus Scott*		674	683	801	925	961
Sinn Féin	Dermot Mullooly*		652	698	799	881	917
Fianna Fáil	Eugene Murphy		632	729	975	1,130	
Fine Gael	Frank Curley		629	637	652		
Fianna Fáil	Sean Neary		533	582			
Electorate: 6,498 Valid: 5,118 (79.32%) Spoilt: 36 Quota: 1,024 Turnout: 5,154
