= 2019 Roscommon County Council election =

Part of the 2019 Irish local elections

← 2014	24 May 2019	2024 →

All 18 seats on Roscommon County Council 10 seats needed for a majority
	First party	Second party	Third party
Party	Fianna Fáil	Fine Gael	Sinn Féin
Seats won	6	2	1
Seat change	▼2	▼1	Steady
	Fourth party
Party	Independent
Seats won	9
Seat change	▲3
- Results by local electoral area

An election to all 18 seats on Roscommon County Council was held on 24 May 2019 as part of the 2019 Irish local elections. County Roscommon was divided into 3 local electoral areas (LEAs) to elect councillors for a five-year term of office on the electoral system of proportional representation by means of the single transferable vote (PR-STV). Only three political parties (Fine Gael, Fianna Fáil and Sinn Féin) fielded candidates in County Roscommon, the fewest of any local government area in the 2019 local elections.

== Boundary review ==
Following the recommendations of the 2018 LEA boundary review committee, no changes were made to the LEAs used at the 2014 Roscommon County Council election.

== Results by party ==
Party	Seats	±	1st pref	FPv%	±%
Fianna Fáil	6	▼2	10,129	33.13	▼1.40
Fine Gael	2	▼1	4,961	16.23	▼6.19
Sinn Féin	1	Steady	2,273	7.43	▼0.68
Independent	9	▲3	13,209	43.21	▲10.15
Total	18	Steady	30,572	100.0	

== Results by local electoral area ==
*: Outgoing councillor elected in 2014.
†: Outgoing councillor coopted subsequent to the 2014 election.

=== Athlone ===
Athlone: 6 seats
Party	Candidate	FPv%	Count						
Party	Candidate	FPv%	1	2	3	4	5	6	7
Independent	Tony Ward	18.86%	1,864						
Independent	Ivan Connaughton (Note: See change below.)	16.10%	1,591						
Fine Gael	John Naughten	14.82%	1,465						
Fianna Fáil	John Keogh	10.22%	1,010	1,096	1,102	1,120	1,197	1,262	1,483
Independent	Donal Kilduff	8.89%	879	955	972	1,002	1,098	1,134	1,264
Independent	Laurence Fallon	8.25%	815	926	941	1,021	1,063	1,159	1,307
Fianna Fáil	Seamus Kelly	7.12%	704	734	737	750	768	935	1,058
Fianna Fáil	Malachy Hand	6.71%	663	752	756	780	804	846	
Fine Gael	Ger Grehan	4.52%	447	469	471	479	496		
Sinn Féin	Joe Harney	3.83%	379	405	410	416			
Independent	Derek McCabe	0.67%	66	76					
Electorate: 15,168 Valid: 9,883 Spoilt: 138 Quota: 1,412 Turnout: 10,021 (66.07%)

=== Boyle ===
Boyle: 6 seats
Party	Candidate	FPv%	Count						
Party	Candidate	FPv%	1	2	3	4	5	6	7
Fianna Fáil	John Cummins	20.50%	2,124						
Independent	Valerie Byrne	15.84%	1,641						
Sinn Féin	Michael Patrick Mulligan	13.81%	1,431	1,477	1,489				
Independent	Tom Crosby	9.82%	1,017	1,054	1,082	1,109	1,139	1,243	1,421
Fine Gael	Liam Callaghan	9.65%	1,000	1,066	1,103	1,114	1,286	1,372	1,526
Fianna Fáil	Joe Murphy	7.75%	803	937	965	970	1,076	1,113	1,228
Fine Gael	Keith Suffin	6.00%	622	843	851	870	897	955	1,076
Fine Gael	Andrew Reynolds	5.64%	584	616	643	652	665	703	
Independent	Sajjad (Saj) Hussain	5.09%	527	552	562	592	643		
Fianna Fáil	Aidan Sampey	4.74%	491	554	556	561			
Independent	Mary O'Donnell	1.15%	119	137	148				
Electorate: 18,037 Valid: 10,359 Spoilt: 201 Quota: 1,480 Turnout: 10,560 (58.55%)

=== Roscommon ===
Roscommon: 6 seats
Party	Candidate	FPv%	Count				
Party	Candidate	FPv%	1	2	3	4	5
Fianna Fáil	Paschal Fitzmaurice	18.99%	1,962				
Independent	Kathleen Shanagher	14.13%	1,460	1,469	1,482		
Independent	Anthony (Tony) Waldron	12.90%	1,333	1,426	1,493		
Fianna Fáil	Orla Leyden	11.61%	1,199	1,241	1,247	1,287	1,469
Fianna Fáil	Marty McDermott	11.36%	1,173	1,195	1,203	1,234	1,394
Independent	Nigel Dineen	9.70%	1,002	1,159	1,203	1,414	1,542
Fine Gael	Gerry Coffey	8.16%	843	892	934	978	1,074
Independent	Domnick Connolly	6.14%	634	647	673	726	
Sinn Féin	Séamus O'Brien	4.48%	463	534	585		
Independent	Padraig Morris	1.79%	185	210			
Independent	John Groarke	0.74%	76	81			
Electorate: 17,450 Valid: 10,330 Spoilt: 165 Quota: 1,476 Turnout: 10,495 (60.14%)

== Results by gender ==
2019 Roscommon County Council election Candidates by gender
Gender	Number of candidates	% of candidates	Elected councillors	% of councillors
Men	29	87.9%	15	83.3%
Women	4	12.1%	3	16.7%
TOTAL	33		18	

== Changes after 2019 ==
=== Changes in affiliation ===
Name	LEA	Elected as	New affiliation	Date
Nigel Dineen	Roscommon	Independent	Independent Ireland	March 2024

=== Co-option ===
Party	Outgoing	LEA	Reason	Date	Co-optee
Independent	Ivan Connaughton	Athlone	Resignation	April 2021	Emer Kelly

== Sources ==
- "Roscommon County Council - Local Election candidates". RTÉ. 14 May 2019. Archived from the original on 6 June 2019.
- "LE19: Live tallies and results from the Roscommon Count Centre". Shannonside FM. 26 May 2019. Archived from the original on 25 May 2019.
- "Local Elections 2019: Results, Transfer of Votes and Statistics" (PDF). Department of Housing, Planning and Local Government (DHPLG). Archived from the original (PDF) on 10 June 2020.
