= County Hall, Roscommon =

Municipal building in County Roscommon, Ireland

- Áras an Chontae, Ros Comáin
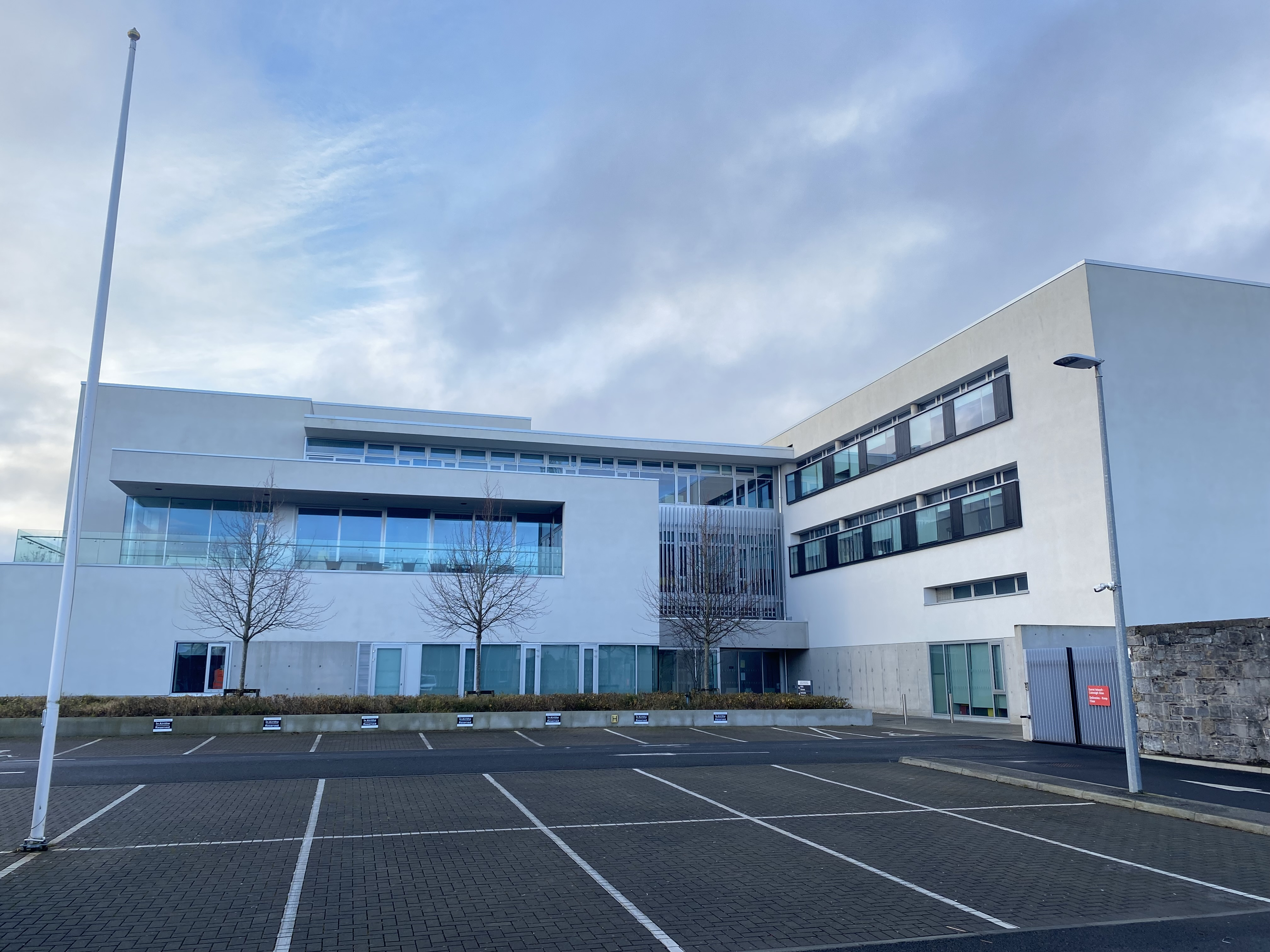
- Roscommon County Hall in December 2024

- Location within Ireland

General information
- Architectural style: Modern style
- Location: Roscommon, County Roscommon, Ireland
- Coordinates: 53.6302°N 8.1942°W
- Completed: 2015

Design and construction
- Architect: ABK Architects

County Hall (Irish: Áras an Chontae, Ros Comáin) is a municipal facility in Roscommon, County Roscommon, Ireland.

== History ==
Originally Roscommon County Council held its meetings in Roscommon Courthouse. The county council moved a new facility, which was designed by ABK Architects, in December 2015. It was officially opened by Denis Naughten, Minister for Communications, Climate Action and Environment, in June 2016. The new facility received awards for Architectural Project of the Year and Sustainable Project of the Year at the CMG Irish Building & Design Awards 2016.
