= Roscommon Courthouse =

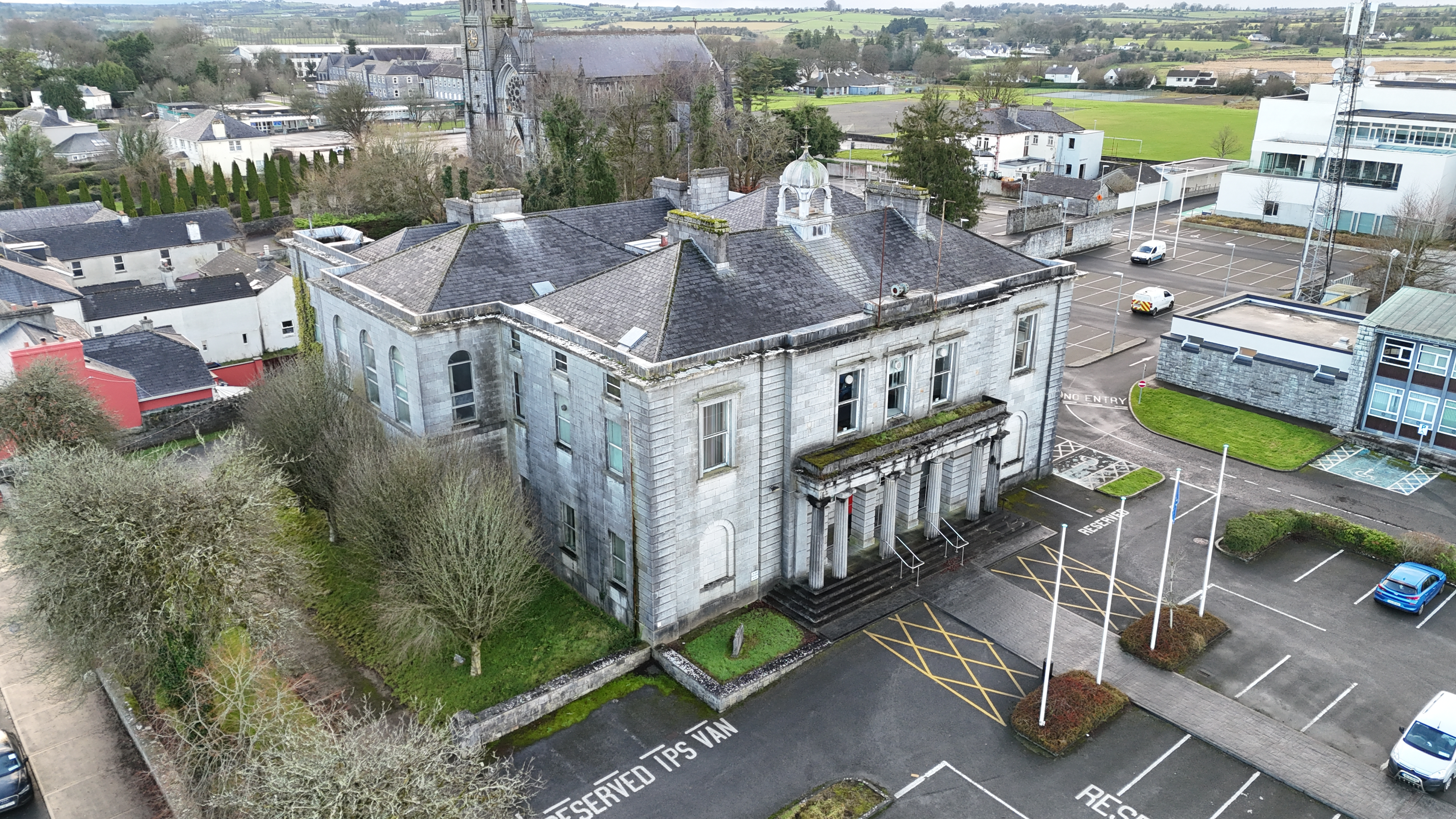
- Roscommon Courthouse in 2024

- Location within Ireland

General information
- Architectural style: Neoclassical style
- Location: Roscommon, County Roscommon, Ireland
- Coordinates: 53.6293°N 8.1936°W
- Completed: 1832

Design and construction
- Architect: Sir Richard Morrison

Roscommon Courthouse is a judicial facility located on Abbey Street, Roscommon, County Roscommon, Ireland.

== History ==
Prior to the construction of the present courthouse, justice was administered in Roscommon in a number of other venues, including in part of Roscommon Abbey in the early seventeenth century, and in Harrison Hall in the Market Square in the eighteenth century and until 1819.

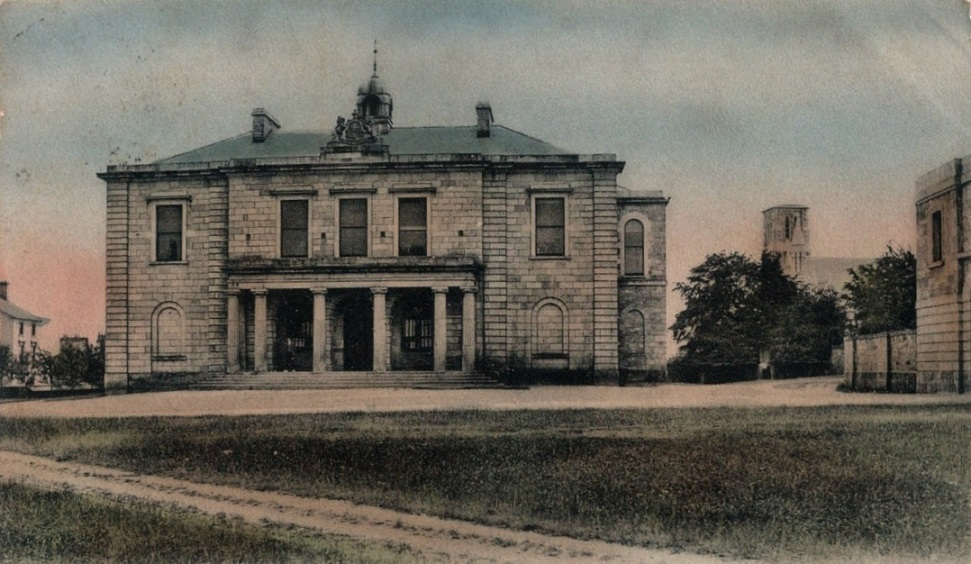
Roscommon Courthouse in the early 20th century

The courthouse, which was designed by Sir Richard Morrison in the neoclassical style and built in ashlar stone, was completed in 1832. It was built beside the new gaol (now the site of Roscommon garda station) to replace the previous courthouse, which is now known as Harrison Hall and which currently houses a branch of the Bank of Ireland. The courthouse was gutted by a major fire on the evening of Wednesday 14 June 1882. The fire was started accidentally when a gas leak was ignited in the courthouse. A half-gale was blowing that evening, and within half an hour the building was in flames. When the roof collapsed in the conflagration, the sparks were carried by the strong winds to the roofs of nearby thatched houses, and the fire continued to spread. All of the thatched houses in the vicinity were quickly destroyed.

The courthouse was restored under the architectural guidance of Christopher Mulvany in 1883. The building was originally used as a facility for dispensing justice but, following the implementation of the Local Government (Ireland) Act 1898, which established county councils in every county, it also became the meeting place for Roscommon County Council. The county council moved to Áras an Chontae in December 2015, leaving the courthouse for the sole use of Roscommon Circuit and District Courts.

In December 1891, Roscommon County Council proposed to fly the Irish flag over the courthouse. The Sheriff banned this proposal. In response, the Council displayed the Irish flag inside the Council chamber instead.

Douglas Hyde delivered an address at the courthouse to a large crowd in 1901.

In December 1907, a portrait of Michael Davitt was erected in the courthouse, and remains in place in the entrance hall today.

The courthouse was the venue for the sittings of Roscommon Circuit and District Courts and also for meetings of Roscommon County Council until December 2015, when the County Council moved to a new purpose-built County Hall on an adjacent site, leaving the courthouse solely dedicated to the administration of justice.

In December 2022, due to the dilapidated condition of the courthouse, the sittings of Roscommon Circuit and District Courts were moved to a temporary facility in the former Fairyland dance hall on the Racecourse Road. The Courts Service indicated an intention to refurbish the courthouse when funding became available.

The Government of Ireland's Sectoral Investment Plan for Justice 2026–2030, published in late 2025, makes no provision for funding for the refurbishment of Roscommon Courthouse.

In January 2026, it was reported that the roof of the courthouse had begun to leak during 2025 and that no works appeared to have been carried out to address the leak or to protect the building from further damage. In May 2026, it was reported that architects had inspected the building to ascertain what works would be required to the roof in order to halt the further deterioration of the courthouse.

In August 2026, the Courts service announced that €350,000 had been allocated to "facilitate the preparatory work required to develop a robust business case and evaluate the options necessary to inform future decisions regarding courthouse accommodation". In November 2026, it was reported that that funding did not relate to Roscommon Courthouse's refurbishment, that the building was becoming "increasingly dilapidated" and that "no progress whatsoever" had been made on reopening the courthouse.

== Architecture ==
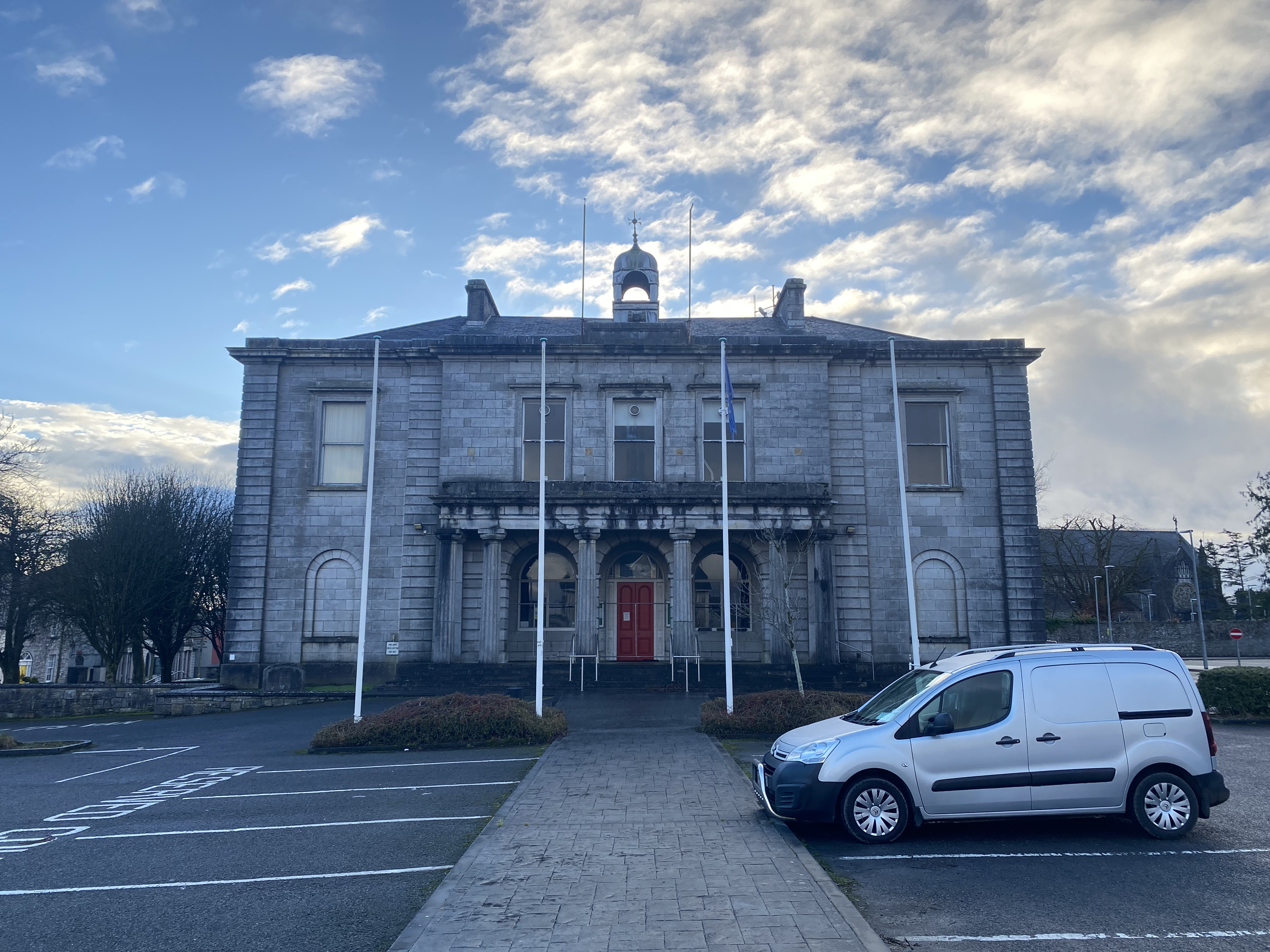
Front elevation of Roscommon Courthouse

The design involves a symmetrical main frontage with five bays facing Abbey Street; the central section of three bays, which slightly projects forward, features a short flight of steps leading up to a hexastyle portico with Doric order columns supporting an entablature and a frieze. There are three sash windows on the first floor and a cornice and a cupola at roof level.

There is a mosaic of the Roscommon crest on the floor of the entrance lobby, which is a reminder of Roscommon's former mosaic industry. There is a large portrait of Douglas Hyde, the first president of Ireland, hanging over the main staircase. The courthouse was originally built with a tunnel leading to the adjacent gaol, for the easy transfer of prisoners. The gaol has long since closed, been demolished and replaced with Roscommon Garda station. However, the courthouse end of the tunnel remains in place.
