= Maura Hopkins =

Irish former politician (born 1984)

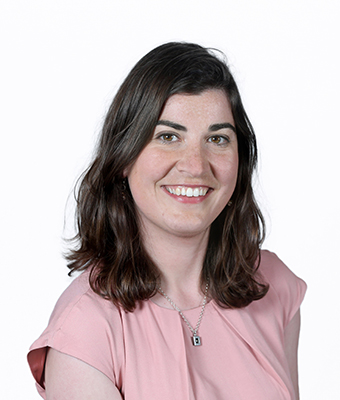
- Hopkins in 2016

Senator
- In office 8 June 2016 – 29 June 2020
- Constituency: Administrative Panel

Personal details
- Born: 3 May 1984 (age 42) Ballaghaderreen, County Roscommon, Ireland
- Party: Fine Gael
- Education: NUI Galway

Maura Hopkins (born 3 May 1984) is an Irish former Fine Gael politician who served as a Senator for the Administrative Panel from 2016 to 2020. She had been a member of Roscommon County Council from 2014 to 2016.

She was an unsuccessful candidate at the 2016 general election for the Roscommon–Galway constituency.

She was the Fine Gael Seanad spokesperson on Arts, Heritage and Regional, Rural and Gaeltacht Development. She was initially chosen as the Fine Gael candidate for Roscommon–Galway at the 2020 general election, but withdrew due to family commitments. She did not contest the 2020 Seanad election.
