= 1999 Roscommon County Council election =

Part of the 1999 Irish local elections

← 1991	10 June 1999	2004 →

All 26 seats to Roscommon County Council
	First party	Second party	Third party
Party	Fine Gael	Fianna Fáil	Progressive Democrats
Seats won	12	9	1
Seat change	+1	-1	+1
	Fourth party
Party	Independent
Seats won	4
Seat change	-1
- Map showing the area of Roscommon County Council
Council control after election
TBD

An election to Roscommon County Council took place on 10 June 1999 as part of that year's Irish local elections. 26 councillors were elected from six local electoral areas for a five-year term of office on the system of proportional representation by means of the single transferable vote (PR-STV).

== Results by party ==
Party	Seats	±	First Pref. votes	FPv%	±%
Fine Gael	12	+1	11,134	38.95	
Fianna Fáil	9	-1	10,529	36.83	
Progressive Democrats	1	+1	771	2.69	
Independent	4	-1	5,846	20.45	
Totals	26	-	28,586	100.00	—

== Results by local electoral area ==
=== Athlone ===
Athlone - 5 seats
Party	Candidate	FPv%	Count						
Party	Candidate	FPv%	1	2	3	4	5	6	7
Fianna Fáil	Senator Michael Finneran*	26.28	1,462						
Fine Gael	Denis Naughten TD*	23.91	1,330						
Fine Gael	Ollie Moore	9.44	525	618	735	796	857	1,083	
Fianna Fáil	Anthony Geraghty	8.61	479	602	623	652	749	916	953
Fianna Fáil	John Curran	8.27	460	583	652	681	707	789	809
Fine Gael	John Dooley	7.71	429	447	543	555	635		
Independent	Eugene Costello	7.05	392	492	541	584	651	711	771
Independent	Tony Ward	5.88	327	366	389	402			
Independent	Tom Naughton	2.86	159	197	224				
Electorate: 8,441 Valid: 5,563 (65.90%) Spoilt: 53 Quota: 928 Turnout: 5,616 (66.53%)

=== Ballaghadreen ===
Ballaghadreen - 4 seats
Party	Candidate	FPv%	Count		
Party	Candidate	FPv%	1	2	3
Fine Gael	Senator John Connor*	25.90	1,034		
Fine Gael	Michael Scally*	20.69	826		
Fianna Fáil	Paddy McGarry	16.03	640	668	801
Progressive Democrats	Hugh Lynn	14.63	584	665	763
Fianna Fáil	Paul Lynch*	14.38	574	600	690
Fianna Fáil	John Mulvihil	8.39	335	435	
Electorate: 6,436 Valid: 3,993 (62.04%) Spoilt: 59 Quota: 799 Turnout: 4,052 (62.96%)

=== Boyle ===
Boyle - 5 seats
Party	Candidate	FPv%	Count								
Party	Candidate	FPv%	1	2	3	4	5	6	7	8	9
Fine Gael	Frank Feighan	19.82	1,090								
Fine Gael	Charlie Hopkins*	12.16	669	682	692	699	705	727	821	854	887
Fine Gael	Kitty Duignan*	10.49	577	607	621	654	688	706	718	832	911
Fine Gael	Gerry Garvey	9.93	546	559	613	618	623	665	677	792	816
Fianna Fáil	John Cummins	9.56	526	546	580	613	670	685	699	706	819
Fianna Fáil	Michael Gaffney	7.75	426	433	444	459	470	535	640	678	726
Independent	Paddy Mulvey	5.11	281	287	291	301	310	331			
Fianna Fáil	Padraig McWeeney	5.00	275	276	299	300	307				
Independent	Paddy Mulvey	4.95	272	275	295	303	310	404	426		
Labour	Tommy Egan	5.10	256	287	300	345	431	437	467	480	
Independent	Francis Geelan	3.49	192	216	220	264					
Progressive Democrats	Gerard Tivnan	3.40	187	208	213						
Fianna Fáil	Tommie Bourke	2.78	153	154							
Green	Vincent Beirne	2.38	50	53							
Electorate: 7,827 Valid: 5,500 (70.27%) Spoilt: 48 Quota: 917 Turnout: 5,548 (70.88%)

=== Castlerea ===
Castlerea - 3 seats
Party	Candidate	FPv%	Count			
Party	Candidate	FPv%	1	2	3	4
Independent	Danny Burke*	28.83	927			
Fine Gael	Michael McGreal*	27.19	874			
Fine Gael	John Murray*	20.34	654	702	728	780
Fianna Fáil	Breege Flanagan	14.06	452	514	718	736
Fianna Fáil	Seamus Sloyan	9.58	308	321		
Electorate: 4,845 Valid: 3,215 (66.36%) Spoilt: 39 Quota: 804 Turnout: 3,254 (67.14%)

=== Roscommon ===
Roscommon - 5 seats
Party	Candidate	FPv%	Count				
Party	Candidate	FPv%	1	2	3	4	5
Independent	Tom Foxe*	22.01	1,224				
Fianna Fáil	Terry Leyden	16.15	898	946			
Fianna Fáil	Des Bruen*	12.23	680	744	749	939	
Fianna Fáil	Martin Connaughton*	11.56	643	670	673	698	931
Fianna Fáil	Paddy Kilduff	10.36	576	604	608	637	
Fine Gael	Gerry Donnelly*	9.58	533	556	557	652	884
Fine Gael	Dominick Connolly*	9.51	529	576	578	733	792
Fine Gael	Brian Keenan	8.60	478	538	542		
Electorate: 8,326 Valid: 5,561 (66.79%) Spoilt: 47 Quota: 927 Turnout: 5,608 (67.36%)

=== Strokestown ===
Strokestown - 4 seats
Party	Candidate	FPv%	Count			
Party	Candidate	FPv%	1	2	3	4
Independent	Tom Crosby*	27.66	1,315			
Fine Gael	Seán Beirne*	16.70	794	854	971	
Independent	Gene Byrne*	16.26	757	813	858	970
Fianna Fáil	Eugene Murphy*	19.78	699	813	922	1,115
Fianna Fáil	Gerry Thompson	10.69	508	551	559	622
Fianna Fáil	John Quinn	9.15	435	458	469	
Fine Gael	Mamie Gearty	5.17	246	314		
Electorate: 6,573 Valid: 4,754 (70.12%) Spoilt: 42 Quota: 951 Turnout: 4,796 (71.13%)
