= Gareth Scahill =

Irish politician

Senator Gareth Scahill
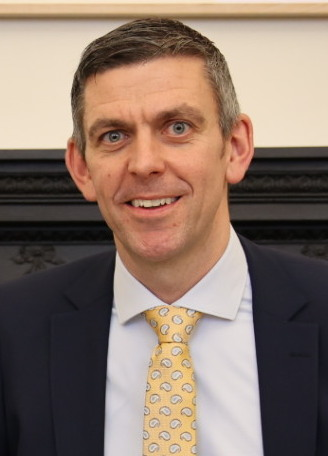
- Scahill in 2025

Senator
- Incumbent
- Assumed office 7 February 2025
- Constituency: Nominated by the Taoiseach

Personal details
- Party: Fine Gael

Gareth Scahill is an Irish Fine Gael politician who has been a senator since February 2025 after being nominated by the Taoiseach.

He was a member of Roscommon County Council for the Roscommon town area from June 2024 to February 2025.
