= 2009 Roscommon County Council election =

Part of the 2009 Irish local elections

- 5 June 2009

All 26 seats on Roscommon County Council
	First party	Second party	Third party
Party	Fine Gael	Fianna Fáil	Sinn Féin
Seats won	10	8	1
Seat change	-	-1	-
	Fourth party
Party	Independent
Seats won	7
Seat change	+1
- Map showing the area of Roscommon County Council
Council control after election
TBD

An election to Roscommon County Council took place on 5 June 2009 as part of that year's Irish local elections. 26 councillors were elected from five local electoral areas (LEAs) for a five-year term of office on the electoral system of proportional representation by means of the single transferable vote (PR-STV).

== Results by party ==
Party	Seats	±	First Pref. votes	FPv%	±%
Fine Gael	10	-	12,621	36.47	
Fianna Fáil	8	-1	10,118	29.24	
Sinn Féin	1	-	1,467	4.24	
Independent	7	+1	10,281	29.71	
Totals	26	-	34,606	100.00	—

== Results by local electoral area ==
=== Athlone ===
Athlone - 6 seats
Party	Candidate	FPv%	Count						
Party	Candidate	FPv%	1	2	3	4	5	6	7
Independent	Tony Ward*	18.28	1,463						
Fine Gael	John Naughten*	16.08	1,287						
Independent	Jimmy Kenny	12.58	1,007	1,072	1,093	1,180			
Fine Gael	Ollie Moore*	10.39	832	870	930	989	1,032	1,403	
Fianna Fáil	John Keogh	8.93	715	744	760	811	882	908	951
Fianna Fáil	Paddy Kilduff*	8.43	675	711	720	733	920	1,027	1,091
Fianna Fáil	Trevor Finneran*	8.20	656	676	683	706	795	876	912
Fine Gael	Dermot Kelly	6.93	555	622	637	671	734		
Fianna Fáil	Anthony Geraghty*	5.65	452	485	489	508			
Sinn Féin	Alma Keogh	4.52	362	393	404				
Electorate: 10,796 Valid: 8,004 (74.14%) Spoilt: 74 Quota: 1,144 Turnout: 8,078 (74.82%)

=== Boyle ===
Boyle - 4 seats
Party	Candidate	FPv%	Count				
Party	Candidate	FPv%	1	2	3	4	5
Fianna Fáil	John Cummins*	22.95	1,321				
Fine Gael	Ernie Keenan*	19.11	1,100	1,162			
Fianna Fáil	Rachel Doherty*	18.02	1,037	1,111	1,196		
Fine Gael	Gerry Garvey*	17.34	998	1,011	1,056	1,079	1,086
Fine Gael	Charlie Hopkins*	16.98	977	987	1,057	1,072	1,075
Sinn Féin	Jane Suffin	5.60	322	332			
Electorate: 7,757 Valid: 5,755 (74.19%) Spoilt: 84 Quota: 1,152 Turnout: 5,839 (75.27%)

=== Castlerea ===
Castlerea - 7 seats
Party	Candidate	FPv%	Count					
Party	Candidate	FPv%	1	2	3	4	5	6
Independent	John Kelly*	24.01	2,230					
Independent	Luke Flanagan*	16.75	1,556					
Fine Gael	Michael McGreal*	9.79	909	942	994	1,054	1,124	1,149
Fine Gael	Michael Creaton*	8.19	761	902	942	966	1,046	1,115
Fine Gael	Liam Callaghan	8.00	743	854	909	949	1,143	1,163
Sinn Féin	Michael Mulligan*	7.48	695	1,011	1,040	1,071	1,094	1,268
Fianna Fáil	Paschal Fitzmaurice	6.96	647	706	788	864	947	1,141
Fianna Fáil	James Kilcoyne	5.92	550	682	691	702	704	
Fine Gael	Michael Frain	5.39	501	685	693	700	710	827
Fine Gael	John Murray	4.63	430	470	525	579		
Independent	Padraig Morris	2.63	244	279	332			
Independent	Ger O'Brien	0.25	23					
Electorate: 12,753 Valid: 9,289 (72.84%) Spoilt: 108 Quota: 1,162 Turnout: 9,397 (73.68%)

=== Roscommon ===
Roscommon - 5 seats
Party	Candidate	FPv%	Count					
Party	Candidate	FPv%	1	2	3	4	5	6
Fianna Fáil	Martin Connaughton*	19.94	1,239					
Independent	Paula McNamara*	19.66	1,222					
Fianna Fáil	Orla Leyden*	16.28	1,012	1,075				
Fine Gael	Laurence Fallon	14.38	894	922	958	961	990	1,051
Fine Gael	Dominick Connolly*	14.22	884	938	1,006	1,019	1,053	
Fianna Fáil	Larry Brennan	11.30	702	752	797	819	830	861
Independent	Martin Connaughton	2.30	143	146	156	156	183	
People Before Profit	Tim Stevens	1.91	119					
Electorate: 8,522 Valid: 6,215 (72.93%) Spoilt: 77 Quota: 1,036 Turnout: 6,292 (73.83%)

=== Strokestown ===
Strokestown - 4 seats
Party	Candidate	FPv%	Count				
Party	Candidate	FPv%	1	2	3	4	5
Independent	Tom Crosby*	21.81	1,181				
Independent	Valerie Byrne*	19.43	1,052	1,071	1,086		
Fianna Fáil	Eugene Murphy*	17.81	964	993	1,003	1,071	1,157
Fine Gael	Seán Beirne*	16.22	806	886	896	918	1,090
Fine Gael	Adrian Cox	11.20	613	640	645	651	762
Fine Gael	John Gormley	6.11	331	334	341	361	
Independent	Mary Rattigan	2.96	160	286	287	362	
Fianna Fáil	John Ames	2.73	148	271	273		
Sinn Féin	Catherine Vallely	1.63	88				
Electorate: 7,349 Valid: 5,414 (73.67%) Spoilt: 54 Quota: 1,083 Turnout: 5,468 (74.40%)
