= Nigel Dineen =

Roscommon Gaelic footballer

Roscommon County Councillor
- Incumbent
- Assumed office 23 May 2014
- Constituency: Roscommon

Personal details
- Party: Independent Ireland (since 2024)
- Other political affiliations: Independent (2014–2024)
- Gaelic games career
- Born: County Roscommon
- Height: 6 ft 0 in (183 cm)
- Sport: Gaelic football
- Position: Corner forward
Club
- Years: Club
- Castlerea St Kevin's
Club titles
- Roscommon titles: 3
Inter-county
Years	County	Apps (scores)
1994–2005	Roscommon	58 (9–89)
Inter-county titles
- Connacht titles: 1

Nigel Dineen is an Irish politician and former Gaelic football manager and player who has served as a member of Roscommon County Council since June 2014. He played for the Castlerea St Kevin's club and at senior level for the Roscommon county team.

== Sports career ==
=== Playing career ===
Dineen won three Roscommon Senior Football Championship titles while playing for Castlerea St Kevin's: in 2003, 2008 and 2009. Castlerea lost to Sligo in 2010.

=== Managerial career ===
In 2011, Dineen was appointed as manager of the Roscommon under-21 team for the 2012 season, having been a selector under the former management team. He led Roscommon to the Connacht Under-21 Football Championship title in his first year in the job and later to the All-Ireland Under-21 Football Championship final, where his side lost to Dublin.

Dineen challenged Kevin McStay for the Roscommon senior management role ahead of the 2017 season, but pulled out a month later, stating that he had "strong reservations about the integrity of the selection and recruitment process".

== Political career ==
In June 2014, Dineen was elected to Roscommon County Council as an independent. In 2024, Dineen joined the Independent Ireland party.
