= Eugene Murphy =

Irish politician (born 1965)

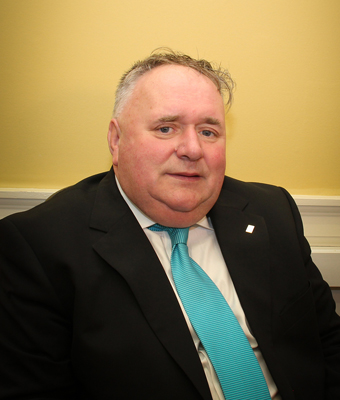
- Murphy in 2016

Senator
- In office 29 June 2020 – 31 January 2025
- Constituency: Agricultural Panel

Teachta Dála
- In office February 2016 – February 2020
- Constituency: Roscommon–Galway

Personal details
- Born: 26 August 1965 (age 60) Strokestown, County Roscommon, Ireland
- Party: Independent
- Other political affiliations: Fianna Fáil (until 2024)
- Education: University College Galway

Eugene Murphy (born 26 August 1965) is an Irish independent politician who served as a Senator for the Agricultural Panel from June 2020 to January 2025. He served as a Fianna Fáil Teachta Dála (TD) for the Roscommon–Galway constituency from 2016 to 2020.

He was a member of Roscommon County Council for the Boyle local electoral area from 1985 to 2016. He is a producer and presenter with local radio stations Shannonside and Northern Sound.

He was the Fianna Fáil spokesperson on the Office of Public Works and Flood Relief.

He lost his seat at the 2020 general election. He was elected to the Seanad at the 2020 Seanad election for the Agricultural Panel.

Murphy sought a nomination from Fianna Fáil to be selected as candidate in Roscommon–Galway at the 2024 general election, but lost the constituency selection vote. On 4 November 2024, after the party told him he would not be added to their general election ticket, Murphy announced that he would contest as an independent. He was not elected to the Dáil, receiving 4,327 (10.5%) first preference votes.

He contested the 2025 Seanad election as an independent candidate but was not elected.

Dáil	Election	Deputy (Party)	Deputy (Party)	Deputy (Party)
32nd	2016	Eugene Murphy (FF)	Denis Naughten (Ind.)	Michael Fitzmaurice (Ind.)
33rd	2020	Claire Kerrane (SF)	Denis Naughten (Ind.)	Michael Fitzmaurice (Ind.)
34th	2024	Claire Kerrane (SF)	Martin Daly (FF)	Michael Fitzmaurice (II)
