= 2004 Roscommon County Council election =

Part of the 2004 Irish local elections

- 11 June 2004

All 26 seats on Roscommon County Council
	First party	Second party	Third party
Party	Fine Gael	Fianna Fáil	Sinn Féin
Seats won	10	9	1
Seat change	-2	-	+1
	Fourth party	Fifth party
Party	Independent	Progressive Democrats
Seats won	6	0
Seat change	+2	-1
- Map showing the area of Roscommon County Council
Council control after election
TBD

An election to Roscommon County Council took place on 11 June 2004 as part of that year's Irish local elections. 26 councillors were elected from six local electoral areas (LEAs) for a five-year term of office on the electoral system of proportional representation by means of the single transferable vote (PR-STV).

== Results by party ==
Party	Seats	±	First Pref. votes	FPv%	±%
Fine Gael	10	-2	11,666	35.88	
Fianna Fáil	9	-	11,768	36.19	
Sinn Féin	1	+1	926	2.85	
Independent	6	+2	6,532	20.09	
Progressive Democrats	0	-1	803	2.47	
Totals	26	-	32,517	100.00	—

== Results by local electoral area ==
=== Athlone ===
Athlone - 5 seats
Party	Candidate	FPv%	Count						
Party	Candidate	FPv%	1	2	3	4	5	6	7
Fine Gael	John Naughten*	23.93	1,564						
Fianna Fáil	Trevor Finneran*	16.59	1,084	1,123					
Fine Gael	Ollie Moore*	12.88	842	1,013	1,021	1,273			
Fianna Fáil	Anthony Geraghty*	11.03	721	744	750	780	793	1,106	
Independent	Tony Ward	10.36	677	719	721	821	859	963	970
Fine Gael	Christine O'Malley	8.36	581	672	674	779	875	951	960
Progressive Democrats	Eugene Costello	8.29	542	574	580				
Fianna Fáil	John Curran*	7.77	524	600	609	638	654		
Electorate: 9,727 Valid: 6,535 (67.18%) Spoilt: 96 Quota: 1,090 Turnout: 6,631 (68.17%)

=== Ballaghadreen ===
Ballaghadreen - 4 seats
Party	Candidate	FPv%	Count							
Party	Candidate	FPv%	1	2	3	4	5	6	7	8
Independent	John Kelly	22.83	1,101							
Sinn Féin	Michael Mulligan	12.75	615	649	699	769	859	919	1,103	
Fine Gael	John Connor*	12.73	614	628	660	685	696	832	992	
Fine Gael	Michael Creaton	11.76	567	580	592	617	626	667	781	828
Fine Gael	Michael Scally*	9.39	453	468	474	520	605	619		
Fianna Fáil	Paul Lynch	9.21	444	454	458	477	569	678	717	756
Fianna Fáil	John Mulvihil	7.05	340	347	373	383	417			
Fianna Fáil	Paddy McGarry*	6.39	308	321	329	366				
Independent	Mary Durkin	4.46	215	236	260					
Independent	P.J. Keenan	2.88	139	147						
Green	Eamonn Ansbro	0.54	26	27						
Electorate: 7,437 Valid: 4,822 (64.84%) Spoilt: 89 Quota: 965 Turnout: 4,911 (66.03%)

=== Boyle ===
Boyle - 5 seats
Party	Candidate	FPv%	Count							
Party	Candidate	FPv%	1	2	3	4	5	6	7	8
Fianna Fáil	John Cummins*	18.87	1,088							
Fine Gael	Charlie Hopkins*	14.10	813	816	824	837	845	876	938	963
Fine Gael	Gerry Garvey*	13.35	770	771	774	782	788	812	969	
Fine Gael	Ernie Keenan*	12.68	731	758	776	792	886	1,035		
Fianna Fáil	Rachel Doherty	10.98	633	659	668	692	723	767	833	861
Fianna Fáil	Alo O'Dowd	10.23	590	615	618	622	633	653	760	776
Fine Gael	Kitty Duignan*	7.27	419	433	443	453	470	511		
Labour	Tommy Egan	5.10	294	305	331	363	406			
Independent	Francis Geelan	3.38	195	202	222	241				
Green	Catherine Ansbro	2.38	137	139	142					
Independent	Malachy Beirne	1.68	97	106						
Electorate: 8,505 Valid: 5,767 (67.81%) Spoilt: 58 Quota: 962 Turnout: 5,825 (68.49%)

=== Castlerea ===
Castlerea - 3 seats
Party	Candidate	FPv%	Count			
Party	Candidate	FPv%	1	2	3	4
Independent	Luke Flanagan	28.23	1,050			
Fianna Fáil	Tony Waldron	23.80	885	911	1,089	
Fine Gael	Michael McGreal*	20.49	762	780	872	913
Fine Gael	John Murray*	12.88	563	594	745	819
Independent	Danny Burke*	11.03	459	504		
Electorate: 5,474 Valid: 3,719 (67.94%) Spoilt: 47 Quota: 930 Turnout: 3,766 (68.80%)

=== Roscommon ===
Roscommon - 5 seats
Party	Candidate	FPv%	Count						
Party	Candidate	FPv%	1	2	3	4	5	6	7
Fianna Fáil	Martin Connaughton*	13.07	876	900	916	973	994	1,044	1,074
Independent	Paula McNamara*	12.22	819	864	895	939	1,030	1,152	
Fine Gael	Dominick Connolly	12.01	805	834	867	902	1,036	1,345	
Fianna Fáil	Orla Leyden	11.74	787	807	831	938	981	1,061	1,101
Fianna Fáil	Des Bruen*	11.62	779	785	803	883	908	959	1,012
Fianna Fáil	Paddy Kilduff	11.11	745	755	780	811	890	1,019	1,074
Fine Gael	Padraig Walsh	8.28	555	562	621	650	790		
Fine Gael	Teresa Donnelly	6.83	458	472	530	547			
Fianna Fáil	P Burke	6.37	427	435	444				
Progressive Democrats	Jimmy Murray	3.89	261	277					
Sinn Féin	Patrick Carton	2.12	142						
Green	Bridget Banham	0.75	50						
Electorate: 9,698 Valid: 6,704 (69.13%) Spoilt: 51 Quota: 1,118 Turnout: 6,755 (69.65%)

=== Strokestown ===
Strokestown - 4 seats
Party	Candidate	FPv%	Count					
Party	Candidate	FPv%	1	2	3	4	5	6
Fianna Fáil	Eugene Murphy*	19.78	983	1,013				
Independent	Tom Crosby*	19.56	972	992	997			
Independent	Valerie Byrne*	16.26	808	861	866	906	953	1,131
Fine Gael	Seán Beirne*	16.22	806	839	843	864	889	966
Fine Gael	Leo Cox	7.30	363	367	367	377	501	587
Labour	Hughie Baxter	6.34	315	329	330	430	471	
Fianna Fáil	Seamus Nugent	5.69	283	286	287	362		
Fianna Fáil	Gerry Thompson	5.45	271	271	273			
Sinn Féin	John Reynolds	3.40	169					
Electorate: 7,088 Valid: 4,970 (70.12%) Spoilt: 72 Quota: 995 Turnout: 5,042 (71.13%)
