= Paddy Concannon =

Irish politician and campaigner

Patrick Concannon (1918 – 26 February 2012) was an Irish local politician. He was born near Castlerea, County Roscommon in 1918. Towards the end of his life he served as president of the Irish Turf Cutters and Contractors Association.

== Political career ==
He served as a county councillor for County Roscommon for a total of 46 years starting in 1945. When first elected he was a member of the agrarian party Clann na Talmhan, which was wound up in the 1960s. He was an unsuccessful Clann na Talmhan candidate at the 1957 general election for the Roscommon constituency. He was later elected as a member of Fine Gael and as an independent.

== Turf Cutters and Contractors Association ==
Concannon was a founder member of the Turf Cutters Association in 1998. This followed the emergence of a threat to turf-cutting when the European Union's Habitats Directive was transposed into Irish law in 1997, and gave protection to raised bogs. The Irish government declared a ten-year derogation, which delayed the full protection of Irish raised bogs. (The derogation was granted to help domestic turf-cutters (as opposed to industrial-scale turf-cutting). When the derogation expired, it was reported that a ban on turf-cutting would apply to more than thirty Special Areas of Conservation with effect from 2009. (Initial reports referred to 32 SACS being affected, later reports refer to a figure of thirty-one).

In a mirror of the derogation granted for continued domestic cutting on SAC raised bogs, a similar de facto 10 year derogation operated in respect of the 75 raised bogs designated for protection in 2004 under the Wildlife Acts. The ban would eventually apply to a total of 139 raised bogs which have been designated for protection in 53 Raised Bog Special Areas of Conservation (SACs) under the Habitats Directive and 75 Natural Heritage Areas (NHAs) under the Wildlife (Amendment) Act, 2000.

In 2008, the Turf Cutters Association amalgamated with the Contractors Association to form the Turf Cutters and Contractors Association of which Concannon was president. Concannon led opposition to the ban on non-commercial turf cutting of raised bogs. Concannon stated that he would do everything he could to overturn the ban. "We will help and assist everyone who wishes to cut turf on the bogs affected," he said. "I have been cutting turf for more than 80 years and I have a great respect for the land. I'm prepared to go to prison if it comes to that."

== See also ==
- Irish Peatland Conservation Council
