= Roscommon County Council =

Local authority of County Roscommon, Ireland

Roscommon County Council Comhairle Contae Ros Comáin
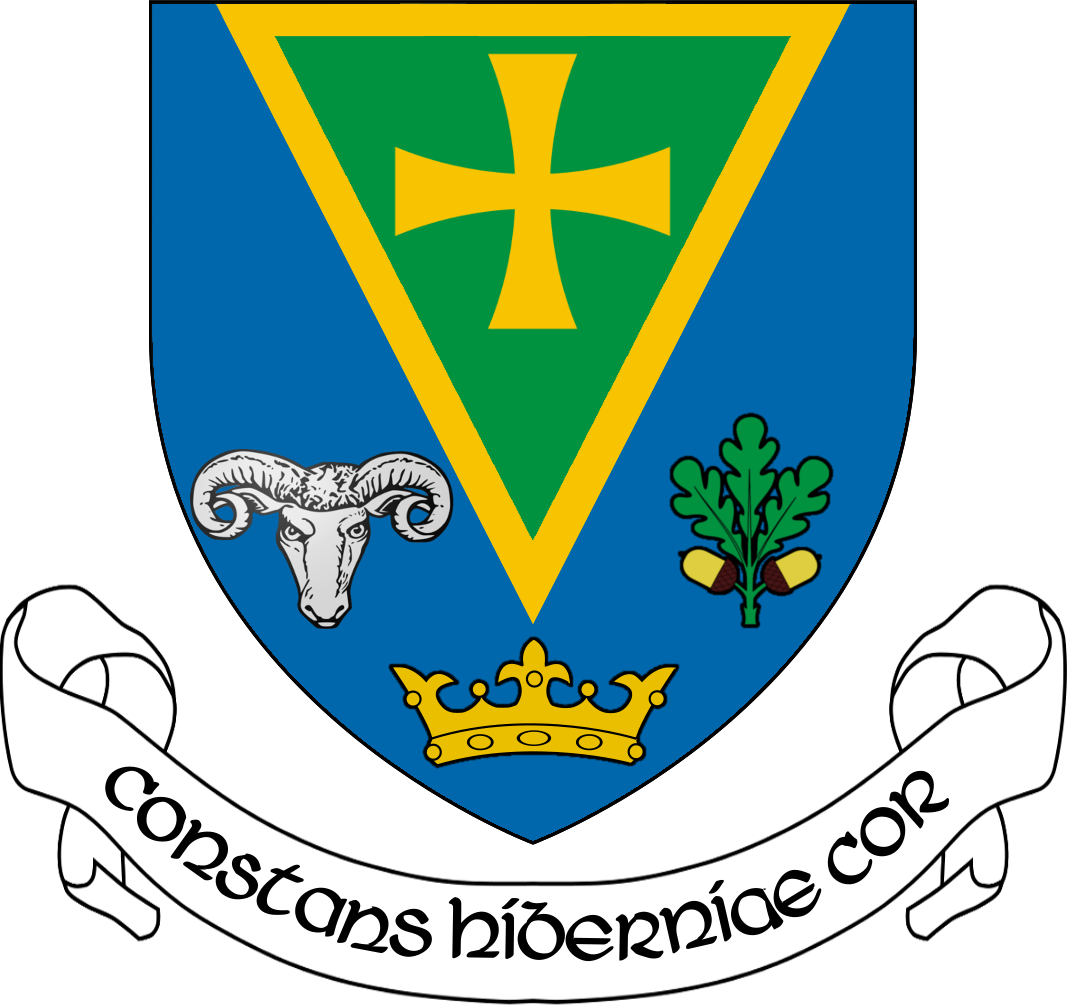

Type
- Type: County council of County Roscommon

History
- Founded: 1 April 1899

Leadership
- Cathaoirleach: Domnick Connolly, FG

Structure
- Seats: 18
- Political groups: Fianna Fáil (5) Fine Gael (4) Independent Ireland (1) Sinn Féin (1) Independent (7)

Elections
- Last election: 7 June 2024

Motto
- Latin: Constans Hiberniae Cor "Steadfast Irish heart"

Meeting place
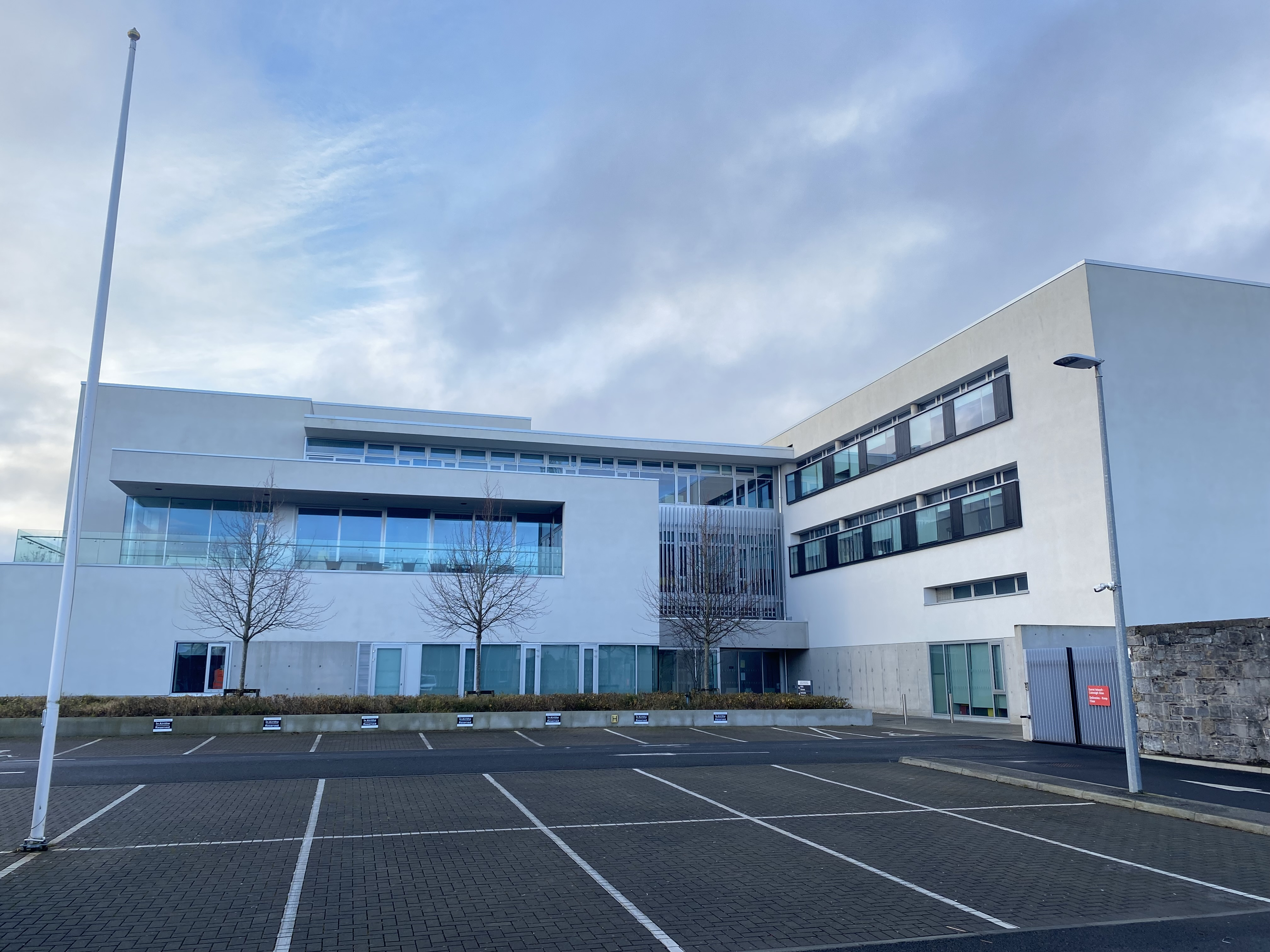
- Áras an Chontae, Roscommon

Website
- Official website

The area governed by the council

Roscommon County Council (Irish: Comhairle Contae Ros Comáin) is the local authority of County Roscommon, Ireland. As a county council, it is governed by the Local Government Act 2001. The council is responsible for housing and community, roads and transportation, urban planning and development, amenities and culture, and the environment. The council has 18 elected members. Elections are held every five years and use the single transferable vote. The head of the council has the title of Cathaoirleach (chairperson). The county administration is headed by a chief executive, Shane Tiernan. The county town is Roscommon.

== History ==
Roscommon County Council was established on 1 April 1899 under the Local Government (Ireland) Act 1898 for the administrative county of County Roscommon. It succeeded the judicial county of Roscommon, except for the portion of Athlone transferred to County Westmeath and Ballinasloe transferred to County Galway; and with the addition of the district electoral division of Rosmoylan from County Galway and the district electoral divisions of Ballaghaderreen and Edmondstown from County Mayo.

Initially, the Roscommon County Council held its meetings in the Roscommon Courthouse. The county council moved to a new facility, known as County Hall, in December 2015.

== Regional Assembly ==
Roscommon County Council has two representatives on the Northern and Western Regional Assembly who are members of the West Strategic Planning Area Committee.

== Elections ==
The Local Government (Ireland) Act 1919 introduced the electoral system of proportional representation by means of the single transferable vote (PR-STV) for the 1920 Irish local elections. County Roscommon was divided into 4 county electoral areas to elect the 21 members of the council. This electoral system has been retained, with 18 members of Roscommon County Council now elected to five-year terms of office from 3 multi-member local electoral areas (LEAs).

Members of Roscommon County Council are elected for a five-year term of office on the electoral system of proportional representation by means of the single transferable vote (PR-STV) from multi-member local electoral areas (LEAs).

Year	FF	FG	SF	II	PDs	Ind.	Total
2024	5	4	1	1	—N/a	7	18
2019	6	2	1	—N/a	—N/a	9	18
2014	8	3	1	—N/a	—N/a	6	18
2009	8	10	1	—N/a	—N/a	7	26
2004	9	10	1	—N/a	0	6	26
1999	9	12	0	—N/a	1	4	26
1991	10	11	0	—N/a	0	5	26
1985	13	8	0	—N/a	—N/a	5	26

== Local electoral areas and municipal districts ==
County Roscommon is divided into LEAs and municipal districts, defined by electoral divisions.

LEA and municipal district	Definition	Seats
Athlone	Athleague East, Athleague West, Athlone West Rural, Ballydangan, Ballynamona, Caltragh, Carnagh, Carrowreagh, Castlesampson, Cloonburren, Cloonown, Crannagh, Creagh, Culliagh, Drumlosh, Dunamon, Dysart, Fuerty, Kilcar, Kiltoom, Lackan, Lecarrow, Lismaha, Moore, Rockhill, Rosmoylan, Scregg, Taghboy, Taghmaconnell, Thomastown and Turrock	6
Boyle	Aghafin, Altagowlan, Annaghmore, Aughrim East, Aughrim West, Ballaghaderreen, Ballyfarnon, Ballyformoyle, Ballygarden, Bellanagare, Boyle Rural, Boyle Urban, Breedoge, Buckill, Bumlin, Cloonteen, Cloonyquin, Creeve (in the former Rural District of Boyle No. 1), Creeve (in the former Rural District of Roscommon), Cregga, Croghan, Crossna, Danesfort, Edmondstown, Elia, Elphin, Estersnow, Frenchpark, Keadew, Kilbryan, Kilcolagh, Kilglass North, Kilglass South, Killukin (in the former Rural District of Boyle No. 1), Killummod, Kilmacumsy, Kilmore, Lisgarve, Lough Allen, Mantua, Oakport, Ogulla, Rockingham, Roosky, Rossmore, Rushfield, Strokestown, Termonbarry, Tivannagh, Tulsk, Tumna North and Tumna South	6
Roscommon	Artagh North, Artagh South, Ballinlough, Ballintober, Baslick, Cams, Carrowduff, Castleplunket, Castlereagh, Castleteheen, Cloonfinlough, Cloonfower, Cloontuskert, Cloonygormican, Coolougher, Drumdaff, Fairymount, Kilbride North, Kilbride South, Kilgefin, Killavackan, Killukin (in the former Rural District of Roscommon), Kilteevan, Kiltullagh, Lissonuffy, Loughglinn, Mote, Roscommon Rural and Roscommon Urban	6

== Councillors ==
=== 2024 seats summary ===
Party	Seats
Fianna Fáil	5
Fine Gael	4
Independent Ireland	1
Sinn Féin	1
Independent	7

=== Councillors by electoral area ===
This list reflects the order in which councillors were elected on 7 June 2024.

Council members from 2024 election
LEA	Name	Party
Athlone	Emer Kelly	Independent
Athlone	Tony Ward	Independent
Athlone	John Naughten (Note: Replaced during term, see table below for details.)	Fine Gael
Athlone	Laurence Fallon	Independent
Athlone	John Keogh	Fianna Fáil
Athlone	Domnick Connolly	Fine Gael
Boyle	Valerie Byrne	Independent
Boyle	Leah Cull	Sinn Féin
Boyle	Micheál Frain	Independent
Boyle	Sean Moylan	Fianna Fáil
Boyle	Tom Crosby	Independent
Boyle	Liam Callaghan	Fine Gael
Roscommon	Paschal Fitzmaurice	Fianna Fáil
Roscommon	Marty McDermott	Fianna Fáil
Roscommon	Anthony Waldron	Independent
Roscommon	Nigel Dineen	Independent Ireland
Roscommon	Larry Brennan	Fianna Fáil
Roscommon	Gareth Scahill	Fine Gael

=== Co-options ===
Party	Outgoing	LEA	Reason	Date	Co-optee
Fine Gael	John Naughten	Athlone	Death	October 2024	Valerie Duffy
Fine Gael	Gareth Scahill	Roscommon	Elected to 27th Seanad at the 2025 Seanad election	29 April 2025	Ruth Connolly Conboy
Independent	Anthony Waldron	Roscommon	Death	26 May 2025	Michael Holland
